= Rasch =

Rasch is a surname of German origin, which meant a person who was quick or rash, from the Middle High German rasch, meaning "quick", "hot-headed" or "hasty". An alternative meaning is as a locational surname for a person from a village called Rasch in Franconia, Germany. The name may refer to:

- Albertina Rasch (1891–1967), American dancer and choreographer
- Anthony Rasch (1778–1858), German-American silversmith
- Bent Peder Rasch (1934–1988), Danish sprint canoeist
- Bjørn Ole Rasch (born 1959), Norwegian musician
- Carl L. Rasch (1866–1961), American judge
- Carlos Rasch (1932–2021), German writer
- Carne Rasch (1847–1914), British politician
- Gabriel Rasch (born 1976), Norwegian cyclist
- Georg Rasch (1901–1980), Danish mathematician
- Halvor Heyerdahl Rasch (1805–1883), Norwegian zoologist
- Hermann Rasch (1914–1974), German U-boat commander
- Johan Lauritz Rasch (1829–1901), Norwegian politician
- Lars Rasch (1797–1864), Norwegian politician
- Lilo Rasch-Naegele (1914–1978), German artist
- Mahmoud Bodo Rasch (born 1943), German architect
- Otto Rasch (1891–1948), German Nazi official
- Raymond Rasch (1917–1964), American musician
- Stian Rasch (born 1987), Norwegian footballer
- Torsten Rasch (born 1965), German musician

== See also ==
- Raasch
- Rasch Baronets
- Rasch model
- Rasch model estimation
- Polytomous Rasch model
- Rasche
- Raiche (disambiguation)
