= Raich (disambiguation) =

Raich is a village in Lörrach, Baden-Württemberg, Germany.

Raich may also refer to:

== Surname ==
- Angel Raich, respondent in Gonzales v. Raich, 545 U.S. 1 (2005); wife of Robert Raich (see below).
- Benjamin Raich (born 1978), Austrian skier
- Carina Raich (born 1979), Austrian skier
- Eric Raich (born 1951), U.S. baseball player
- Hermann Raich (1934–2009), Roman Catholic bishop in Papua New Guinea
- Johann Michael Raich (1832–1907), Bavarian Germanic Catholic theologian
- Josep Raich (1913–1988), Catalunyan Spaniard soccer player
- Marlies Raich née Schild (born 1981), Austrian skier
- Robert Raich, counsel in Gonzales v. Raich, 545 U.S. 1 (2005); husband of Angel Raich (see above).
- Semyon Raich (1792–1855; Семён Егорович Раич), Russian poet

=== Given name ===
- Raich Carter (1913–1994), British soccer and cricket player

== Other ==
- "The Raich", an episode of the Star Wars animated series Ewoks
- Gonzales v. Raich or Ashcroft v. Raich, a U.S. Supreme Court case about the Commerce Clause and home-grown cannabis
- Truax v. Raich (aka "Raich"), a U.S. labor law case about the right to work

== See also ==
- Raych Seldon, a fictional character from Isaac Asimov's Foundation Saga
- Rajch, a name of Germany
- Reich (disambiguation)
- Raiche (disambiguation)
- Rasche (surname)
- Rasch (surname)
