= David Andrich =

Australian academic and assessment specialist

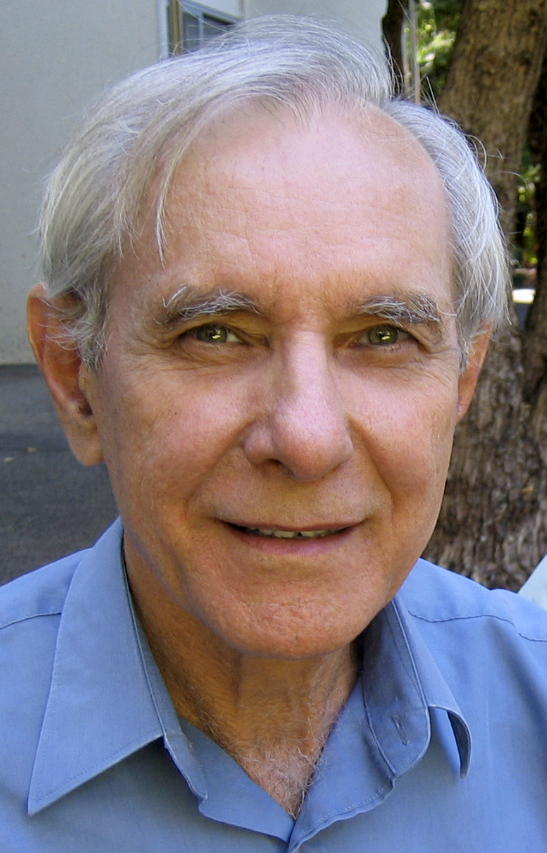
- Professor Andrich at The University of Western Australia
- Born: Perth, Western Australia
- Education: University of Chicago
- Known for: Contributions to Rasch measurement theory, quantitative research methods
- Awards: Susan Colver Rosenberger prize, Fellow of the Academy of Social Sciences of Australia
- Scientific career
- Fields: Education, Psychometrics, Quantitative Methods
- Institutions: The University of Western Australia, Murdoch University
- Notable students: Liz Constable

David Andrich is an Australian academic and assessment specialist. He has made substantial contributions to quantitative social science including seminal work on the Polytomous Rasch model for measurement, which is used in the social sciences, in health and other areas.

Andrich is currently a Winthrop Professor at the University of Western Australia, where he holds the Chapple Chair in Education. He was elected a Fellow of the Academy of Social Sciences of Australia in 1990 for contributions to measurement in the social sciences. Andrich also worked with Georg Rasch in Denmark and Australia. He is one of the most prominent advocates of Rasch's probabilistic measurement models.

== Biography ==
=== Education ===
David Andrich completed his BSc in mathematics and applied mathematics at the University of Western Australia. He briefly taught high school mathematics and worked in the curriculum branch of the Education Department of Western Australia, before being appointed to the Department of Education at The University of Western Australia.

Andrich completed his PhD at the University of Chicago's MESA program in the School of Education in 1973. His PhD Committee consisted of Benjamin D Wright, R Darrell Bock, and Shelby J. Haberman. In 1977, he spent six months as a fellow of the Danish Institute for Educational Research working with the late Danish mathematician Georg Rasch, and he spent another six months as a research fellow at the University of Chicago working with Benjamin D Wright|. In 1986, he spent a further six months at the University of Chicago.

=== Career ===
In 1990 and in 1993 and 1996, Andrich was appointed a visiting professor at the University of Trento in Italy for periods of two months. In 1986, he took up the position of Professor of Education at Murdoch University, where he worked until 2007. During that time, he was the Dean of Education at Murdoch University from 1988-1990 inclusive, and from June 2003 until end May 2005. In 2007, he returned to The University of Western Australia as Chapple Professor of Education.

Andrich has been a member of editorial boards for a number of journals including Psychometrika (1995–2003), Applied Psychological Measurement (1986-), the Journal of Educational Measurement (1984–1989) and Australian Journal of Education (1990–1993). He has written a number of reports for both the state and federal governments, and in 1990 he was made a Fellow of the Academy of Social Sciences of Australia for his contributions to measurement in the social sciences. He continues to teach educational measurement.

He is especially known for his work in item response theory, with a particular focus on Rasch models for measurement. His research and work ranges from the philosophy of measurement, through model developments, exposition and interpretation, to software development. He has published in Educational, Psychological, Sociological and Statistical journals. He is the author of Rasch Models for Measurement (Sage) and coauthor of the software package Rasch Unidimensional Measurement Models (RUMMLab). He has published extensively in areas ranging from Rasch models to philosophy of science. Some of these publications are listed in articles on the Rasch model and polytomous Rasch model.

Andrich has organized a series of conferences on Rasch measurement models hosted in Perth, Western Australia, which have attracted researchers from a wide array of countries. He has held major grants with the Australian Research Council continuously since 1985. As recognition for his works, he was awarded the Susan Colver Rosenberger prize for his research while completing his PhD at the University of Chicago.

== Major publications ==
- Andrich, D. (1988) Rasch Models for Measurement. Newbury Park, CA: Sage.
