= Wendy Rheault =

Canadian academic administrator

President of Rosalind Franklin University of Medicine and Science
- In office January 2019 – November 2025; Interim: January 2019 – June 30, 2019

Personal details
- Born: August 21, 1955 (age 71)
- Education: Queen's University at Kingston; University of Chicago

Wendy Lee Rheault (born August 21, 1955) is a Canadian academic administrator specializing in psychometrics. She served as the seventh president of the Rosalind Franklin University of Medicine and Science (RFU) from 2019 to November 2025, when she became president emerita. She is credited with developing a unique interprofessional model of collaborative care which requires RFU students in all six colleges of the university to take a common course in their first quarter aimed at training them to work across disciplines for the best care of patients, and credited with creating RFU's College of Nursing in 2022.

== Life ==
Rheault was born on August 21, 1955. She earned a B.S. in physical therapy from the Queen's University at Kingston. She received a master's degree in curriculum and instruction and a Ph.D. in measurement, evaluation, and statistical analysis from the University of Chicago department of education. Her dissertation was titled, Learning Styles of Physical Therapy Students. Benjamin Drake Wright was Rheault's doctoral advisor.

Using the Rasch model, Rheault conducts psychometric analyses of clinical and educational measurement instruments. At the Rosalind Franklin University of Medicine and Science, she was the associate dean of the college of health professions for ten years before being promoted to dean from 2003 to 2014. In 2008, she was appointed vice president of academic affairs. She served as provost from 2014 to 2018. In January 2019, she became the interim president. She formally assumed the role on July 1, 2019. She is the first female president of the university.
