= Andrich =

Andrich is a surname. Notable people with the surname include:

- David Andrich, Australian academic and assessment specialist
- Robert Andrich (born 1994), German professional footballer
- Sylvie Andrich-Duval (born 1958), Luxembourgish politician
