= Gordon Davis =

American lawyer and civic leader (1941–2026)

Gordon J. Davis

Parks Commissioner of New York City
- In office January 23, 1978 – April 1, 1983
- Appointed by: Ed Koch
- Preceded by: Joseph P. Davidson
- Succeeded by: Henry Stern

Personal details
- Born: Gordon Jamison Davis; August 7, 1941 Chicago, Illinois, U.S.
- Died: October 4, 2026 (aged 85) New York City, U.S.
- Spouse: Peggy Cooper (m. 1968)
- Children: 1
- Education: Hyde Park High School; Francis Parker School; Williams College (BA); Columbia University; Harvard University (JD)
- Occupation: Lawyer, civic leader

Gordon Jamison Davis (August 7, 1941 – October 4, 2026) was an American lawyer and civic leader. He was born in Chicago in 1941 and moved to New York City after his graduation from Harvard Law School in 1967, where he became a leader in New York City's public, civic, and legal affairs. He was Mayor Ed Koch's first New York City Parks Commissioner and is considered to have been New York's most successful parks commissioner since the Robert Moses era. In 2012, Davis became a partner in the New York office of the law firm Venable LLP.

Davis was one of the first African Americans to become a partner in a major New York corporate law firm (Lord Day & Lord, 1983). He was the Founding Chairman of Jazz at Lincoln Center, one of the four Founding Trustees of the Central Park Conservancy, a Founding Member in the first class inducted into the Performing Arts Hall of Fame at Lincoln Center, a Life Trustee of the New York Public Library, an appointee of President Barack Obama to the board of the Kennedy Center for the Performing Arts, and a recipient of an honorary degree (LL.D.) and the Bicentennial Medal from his alma mater, Williams College.

== Early life and education ==
Davis was born in Chicago on August 7, 1941, where he lived on the South Side in the Woodlawn/Englewood area and then in the Hyde Park-Kenwood neighborhood next to the University of Chicago. His parents were Dr. W. Allison Davis and Elizabeth Stubbs Davis, both Harvard and University of London trained social anthropologists who collaborated on studies of caste and class in the U.S. South in the 1930s and 1940s. Dr. Davis became the John Dewey Distinguished Professor of Education at the University of Chicago.

He attended the public Hyde Park High School and then the private Francis Parker School. He attended Williams College, where he graduated in 1963. At Williams, Davis was the vice president of the senior honor society Gargoyle and the co-founder and co-chair of the Williams Civil Rights Committee. In 2022, Williams established the Gordon J. Davis '63 Social and Racial Justice Fellowship.

Following graduate studies at Columbia University (1963–1964), Davis attended Harvard Law School, where he graduated in 1967. He was a founder of the Harvard Law School Black Law Students Association (the first BLSA chapter in the country). He was one of the earliest contributors to the newly established Harvard Civil Rights-Civil Liberties Law Review (Volume II of the Review (spring 1967); (See various later publications and comments in 1981, 1983, 2004, and 2015).

== Career ==
=== Government and public service ===
Beginning in the reform administration of New York Mayor John V. Lindsay in 1967, Davis was a special assistant to Lindsay and secretary of the Mayor's Cabinet. In 1973 Lindsay appointed Davis to be a commissioner of the seven-member New York City Planning Commission (during his city planning service Davis was affiliated with the law firm of Poletti Friedan Praskher Feldman). In January 1978 he was appointed by Mayor Edward Koch as Commissioner of Parks and Recreation. As Parks Commissioner from 1978 to spring 1983, Davis was widely credited with reviving and restoring New York City's parks after the city's fiscal collapse, and is considered the most successful New York City parks commissioner since the Robert Moses era.

Davis's innovations as Parks Commissioner included the urban park rangers, borough decentralization, privatization of the city's 13 golf courses, the revival of Bryant Park through the Bryant Park Restoration Corporation, establishment of the Prospect Park administrator's office, and the founding of the Central Park Conservancy. Davis was recognized in 2020 by the New York Landmarks Conservancy as a Living Landmark for his outstanding contributions to the city.

Following the Koch administration, Davis was a member of Mayor David Dinkins's transition committee and later served as chair of Mayor Michael Bloomberg's 2001–2002 criminal justice transition committee.

=== Private law practice ===
From 2012 on, Davis was a partner in the New York office of Venable LLP. He first became a partner in a large New York firm when he joined Lord Day & Lord in April 1983. At the time, he was one of only five African Americans who were partners in a New York Wall Street–type corporate law firm. From 1994 to 2012 Davis was a partner at Leboeuf Lamb Green & McRae. In 2001 he took a leave of absence from Leboeuf to serve as president of Lincoln Center Inc. Davis represented a variety of institutions in some of the most important public-private projects in New York City, including the New York Public Library, Lincoln Center for the Performing Arts, Mt. Sinai Medical Center, Amtrak, the Billie Jean King National Tennis Center and the United States Tennis Association, Jazz at Lincoln Center, the American Museum of Natural History, the Studio Museum in Harlem, and the 9/11 Memorial and Museum by the Lower Manhattan Development Corporation.

Davis was recognized as one of New York's most accomplished lawyers and as one of the nation's top African American lawyers. Davis and Conrad Harper of Simpson Thatcher organized the concerted efforts of New York's African American law partners which led the New York Bar Association in the late 1980s to establish the Vance Committee to Enhance Professional Opportunities for Minorities (chaired by Cyrus Vance Sr. and composed of the leaders of New York's 35 major law firms).

=== Civic and cultural involvement ===
Davis was one of four Founding Trustees of the Central Park Conservancy along with Elizabeth Barlow Rogers, William Sperry Beinecke and Richard Gilder. Davis and these three individuals, together with Mayor Koch, conceived and established the Conservancy in 1980–1982. The Conservancy has completely restored and rebuilt and maintains the Frederick Law Olmsted and Calvert Vaux landmark Central Park. Davis was the Founding Chairman of Jazz at Lincoln Center (JALC). In 1989 he joined jazz musician and educator Wynton Marsalis, Lincoln Center chairman George Weissman and author Albert Murray to spearhead the founding of JALC. As chairman of JALC from its inception in 1989 until 2001, Davis "was a driving force in [JALC] becoming an independent constituent of Lincoln Center Inc., in July 1996, equal to each of the other performing arts on the Lincoln Center campus and also in the conception and construction of [JALC's] home Frederick P. Rose Hall, the 'House of Swing'".

Davis, who served as president of Lincoln Center in 2001, was selected in 2016 as a Founding Member of the Performing Arts Hall of Fame at Lincoln Center. He was a Life Trustee of the New York Public Library and was appointed in 2010 by President Barack Obama to serve a six-year term as a trustee of the Kennedy Center for the Performing Arts.

== Recognition ==
Davis held honorary degrees from Williams College (Doctor of Laws) and Bard College (Doctor of Humane Letters). He was a recipient of the Williams College Bicentennial Medal, the Central Park Conservancy Frederick Law Olmsted Medal, and the Medal of the City of New York for Exceptional Service. He was also honored by the New York 100 Black Men, the Harlem School of the Arts (Founders Medal), the Dance Theater of Harlem, The Citizens Committee for New York (Chapin Award for the Arts), New Yorkers for Parks, the Studio Museum in Harlem, and the Prospect Park Alliance. He was also a recipient of Jazz at Lincoln Center's Ed Bradley Award for Leadership, and was designated in 2020 as a NYC Living Landmark.

== Personal life and death ==
In 1968, Davis married Peggy Cooper, a former New York State Family Court judge who is the John S. R. Shad Professor of Lawyering and Ethics at the New York University Law School. The Davises have a daughter, Elizabeth Cooper Davis, a performing artist and educator.

Davis's brother, Allison Stubbs Davis, lives in Chicago. He is a lawyer, real estate developer, and community planner.

Davis died from emphysema at a hospital in Manhattan, on October 4, 2026, at the age of 85.
