= Carl H. Peterson =

American politician (1895–1979)

Member of the Nebraska Legislature from the 15th district
- In office January 5, 1937 – January 7, 1941
- Preceded by: Position created
- Succeeded by: H. G. Greenamyre

Personal details
- Born: October 5, 1895 Argyle, Wisconsin
- Died: March 6, 1979 (aged 83) Lincoln, Nebraska
- Party: Republican
- Spouse: Lucile
- Education: University of Nebraska (LL.B.)
- Occupation: Attorney

Military service
- Allegiance: United States
- Branch/service: United States Army

Carl Henry Peterson (October 5, 1895 – March 6, 1979) was a Republican politician from Nebraska who served as a member of the Nebraska Legislature from the 15th district from 1937 to 1941.

== Early life ==
Peterson was born in Argyle, Wisconsin, in 1895, and moved with his family to Nebraska in 1901, where he grew up in Neligh. Peterson served in the U.S. Army from 1917 to 1919 in World War I, and graduated from the University of Nebraska with his bachelor of laws degree. He began practicing law in Norfolk in 1922.

== Political career ==
In 1926, Peterson ran for the Nebraska House of Representatives from the 49th district, challenging incumbent State Representative Obed Raasch in the Republican primary. Raasch narrowly defeated him, winning by 14 votes.

Peterson ran for Madison County Attorney in 1930. He won the Republican primary, defeating incumbent County Attorney Hadley Kelsey. He won the general election over the Democratic nominee, H. F. Barnhart. Peterson was defeated in 1934 by Democrat George Dittrick.

== Nebraska Legislature ==
In 1936, Peterson ran for the Nebraska Legislature from the newly created 15th district, which included Madison and Pierce counties. He ran in a crowded primary, facing former State Senator Watson Purdy, State Representatives S. J. Finnegan and Marjorie Stark, Ernest Raasch, and J. M. Sullivan. Peterson and Stark advanced to the general election, which Peterson won, defeating Stark with 57 percent of the vote.

Peterson ran for re-election in 1938, and was challenged by former State Representative F. A. Uttecht. He placed first in the primary, winning 61 percent of the vote, but only narrowly won the general election, receiving 51 percent of the vote to Uttecth's 49 percent.

In 1940, Peterson sought a third term, and was challenged by six opponents. Peterson placed second in the primary to H. G. Greenamyre, receiving 27 percent of the vote to Greenamyre's 30 percent, and they advanced to the general election. Greenamyre defeated Peterson by a wide margin, receiving 66 percent of the vote to Peterson's 34 percent.

== Post-legislative career ==
After leaving the legislature, Peterson resumed the practice of law. In 1943, he was appointed an assistant attorney general in the Nebraska Attorney General's office. Peterson was later hired as the Nebraska Game and Parks Commission as its legal counsel, but his position was terminated in 1955 due to budget cuts.

== Death ==
Peterson died on March 6, 1979.
