= Senator Gerhart =

Senator Gerhart may refer to:

- H. L. Gerhart (1897–1989), Nebraska State Senate
- Robert Gerhart (1920–2021), Pennsylvania State Senate
