= Raasch =

Raasch is a German surname. Notable people with the surname include:

- Emanuel Raasch (1955–2026), German racing cyclist
- Ernest Raasch (1879–1954), American politician from Nebraska
- Sara Raasch (born 1989), American young adult fiction author

== See also ==
- Rasch
