= Deep South (disambiguation) =

The Deep South is a region of the United States.

Deep South may also refer to:

- Deep South (film), 1937 short film
- Deep South Records (Nashville record label)
- "The Deep South" (Futurama), an episode of the TV show Futurama
- Deep South (travel book), by Paul Theroux
- Deep South (ethnographic book), by Allison Davis
- Deep South (Josh Turner album)
- Deep South (Bill Leverty album)
- Deep South Wrestling, professional wrestling promotion
- The southern South Island of New Zealand, especially the Southland and Otago Regions
- DeepSouth A neuromorphic supercomputer called DeepSouth
- Deep South, Te Kōmata o Te Tonga a New Zealand government run research programme into the role of the Antarctic and Southern Ocean in determining New Zealand’s future climate
