= Benjamin Drake Wright =

American psychometrician (1926–2015)

- Benjamin D. Wright with his ruler
- Born: March 30, 1926; Wilkes Barre, Pennsylvania, United States
- Died: October 25, 2015 (aged 89); Chicago, Illinois
- Education: Cornell
- Known for: Rasch measurement theory, methods, estimation, models, applications
- Awards: Association of Test Publishers Career Achievement Award in Computer-Based Testing, 2001 Institute for Objective Measurement Lifetime Achievement Award, 2003
- Scientific career
- Fields: Physics, Psychology, Education, Psychometrics
- Workplaces: University of Chicago
- Doctoral advisor: Bruno Bettelheim
- Doctoral students: Wendy Rheault

Benjamin Drake Wright (March 30, 1926 – October 25, 2015) was an American psychometrician. He is largely responsible for the widespread adoption of Georg Rasch's measurement principles and models. In the wake of what Rasch referred to as Wright's “almost unbelievable activity in this field” in the period from 1960 to 1972, Rasch's ideas entered the mainstream in high-stakes testing, professional certification and licensure examinations, and in research employing tests, and surveys and assessments across a range of fields. Wright's seminal contributions to measurement continued until 2001, and included articulation of philosophical principles, production of practical results and applications, software development, development of estimation methods and model fit statistics, vigorous support for students and colleagues, and the founding of professional societies and new publications.

Georg Rasch and Benjamin Wright

Benjamin Wright with a photo of Georg Rasch

== Biography ==
Wright was born in Wilkes Barre, Pennsylvania, on March 30, 1926. He retired in October, 2001.

=== Early life and education (1926–1960) ===
Wright's experiences at age seven with mental testing sparked his lifelong interest in tests and test questions. Wright's mother, Dorothy Wright (née Wadhams, 1902–1995), was a lifelong advocate of progressive education. In the summer of 1933, his mother sent him to Housatonic Camp in Canaan, Connecticut, where he was individually given a battery of tests over the course of that summer. The tests were administered by teachers and staff from the Little Red School House in Greenwich Village, New York City. Wright subsequently attended Little Red over the course of grades 2 and 4 to 7. Thus, Wright's education was shaped by early advocates of integrating scientific assessment into the classroom, including Elisabeth Irwin and Bank Street College founder Lucy Sprague Mitchell. At the time, the Little Red course of study was based on curricula outlined in Mitchell's Here and Now Story Book and Young Geographers.

From 1940 to 1944, Wright attended The Hill School in Pottstown, Pennsylvania. In June 1944, at age 18, Wright enlisted in the U.S. Navy. As the result of his score on the Army Navy College Qualifying Test, Wright was assigned to the V-12 Navy College Training Program and to fulfill his military duty at Cornell University studying physics. The Cornell physics faculty included Richard Feynman who, in parallel with John von Neumann, had begun adapting an IBM business punch card machine to solve the Los Alamos physicists’ linear equations more quickly. This work led to the modern computer. As well as graduating with Honors from the physics program within three years, Wright's Cornell transcript shows he was awarded 87 additional credit hours “for work in the School of Electrical Engineering…under the V-12 program,” indicating the extent of Wright's work with early computer prototypes for the US military.

In the summer of 1947, after graduating from Cornell and receiving an honorable discharge from the US Navy, Wright interned at Bell Laboratories in Murray Hill, New Jersey, under the mentorship of Nobel Laureate Charles H. Townes. Townes had begun a series of pioneering studies in microwave spectroscopy, but had no budget for a laboratory assistant. Wright's contributions as an intern led to his first scientific publication, completed before he entered graduate school.

In the fall of 1947, Wright enrolled as a graduate student in the University of Chicago Physics Department. In January 1948, he was hired as a research assistant to Nobel Laureate Robert S. Mulliken (1896–1986) at the university's Laboratory of Molecular Structure and Spectra. John R. Platt, known for his work on strong inference, was his supervisor and Clemens C. J. Roothaan was his lab partner. Mulliken and his colleagues made pioneering contributions to molecular orbital physics modeling electron waveforms.

Wright continued work as a research assistant with Mulliken and his colleagues until 1951. However, Wright's interests extended beyond the physics laboratory. He directed a group theater for young adults at the Gads Hill Center in the Pilsen neighborhood of the Lower West Side, Chicago and he took classes from psychologist Carl Rogers and sociologist Lloyd Warner (with whom he would later work at Social Research Inc.). Wright also attended several lectures given by Louis Thurstone, a pioneer in psychological measurement and psychometrics.

Believing that understanding how children learn was even more important than understanding molecular structure, in late spring of 1948 Wright made a dramatic shift of focus. He left a major in physics to enroll in the Committee on Human Development. The committee had been organized in 1940 by then Education Department Chair Ralph W. Tyler to promote cross disciplinary research, which appealed to the young Wright. In 1951, Wright became a counselor at the Orthogenic School of the University of Chicago, then directed by Bruno Bettelheim who was also faculty on the Committee on Human Development.

During this period, Wright also earned a Certificate in Psychoanalytic Childcare from the Chicago Institute for Psychoanalysis (1954), a Doctorate in Philosophy of Human Development from the University of Chicago (1957), and an Illinois State license to practice clinical psychology (1959, 1964). Wright and Bettelheim co-authored two papers.

In the mid-1950s, Wright's neighbor in Chicago was the statistician Leonard Jimmie Savage. They became close friends. Daily discussions with Savage inspired Wright's interest in statistics, and in January 1957, Wright began teaching statistics and psychology at the University of Chicago Departments of Education and Psychology. Almost immediately Wright ran into trouble with his departmental colleagues for criticizing the scientific basis of education statistics texts. He would likely have lost his position had not Savage intervened on his behalf.

In 1959, the University of Chicago received a gift of a UNIVAC I (1 kilobyte) vacuum tube computer, and, in 1962, the university received a $2.5 million IBM 7090 main frame computer. The latter took up the entire basement of the Institute for Computer Research at 5640 S. Ellis, Chicago. A computer was a tool then unfamiliar to social scientists. Wright, however, especially in his work with Mulliken and Roothaan, had experience writing computer programs to glean information from empirical data. He seized the opportunity to write a program to perform factor analysis and regression on the new computer. Wright may then have written and employed the first computer program for factor analysis in the social sciences.

In 1960, Savage invited Georg Rasch to give a series of 24 lectures on his "models for measurement" at the University of Chicago. The Rasch model for constructing measures of ability and difficulty on the same scale subsequently became the focus of Wright's career.

=== Contributions to measurement (1960–2001) ===
Wright was dissatisfied with the results of the factor analysis work he'd been doing in the late 1950s on semantic differential data from Chicago area firms' marketing projects. He found the instability of the factors across data sets disconcerting, especially since the lack of a stochastic frame of reference meant there were no standard errors for the factor loadings. Listening to Rasch's lectures in 1960, Wright saw there was another way leading to results that were "stable in terms that a physicist would accept." Extending Rasch's own analogies from James Clerk Maxwell's analysis of mass, force, and acceleration, Wright subsequently used an everyday yardstick in his teaching to convey measurement concepts simply and clearly.

Over the course of the years 1958–2001, Wright chaired 69 dissertations and served on 52 other dissertation committees. The vast majority of these involved new Rasch models, estimation methods, fit statistics, or data applications. Wright's former students include leaders in psychometrics in academic, commercial, and governmental positions globally, such as Wan Rani Abdullah, Raymond Adams, David Andrich, Betty Bergstrom, Nikolaus Bezruczko, Brian Bontempo, William Boone, Ong Kim Lee, Sunhee Chae, Chih-Hung Chang, Bruce H. Choppin, Yi Du, Graham Douglas, George Engelhard, Jr., Patrick B. Fisher, William P. Fisher, Jr., Richard Gershon, Dorothea Juul, George Karabatsos, Ross Lambert, John M. Linacre, Larry Ludlow, Geofferey Masters, Ronald Mead, Robert Mislevy, Mark Moulton, Carol Myford, Nargis Panchapakesan, Wendy Rheault, Matthew Schulz, Richard M. Smith, John Stahl, Douglas Stone, Gregory Stone, Donna Surges Tatum, Herbert Walberg, Mark Wilson, Lih Mei Yang, and many others.

Among Wright's students, Bruce H. Choppin stands out as an early and influential advocate of Rasch measurement. Choppin died unexpectedly in Chile in 1983. The International Association for the Evaluation of Educational Achievement has conferred the IEA Bruce H. Choppin Memorial Award on new researchers doing innovative work in education-related areas since 1985.

Colleagues influenced by Wright include Pedro Alvarez, Trevor Bond, Abraham Bookstein, David Cella, Anne G. Fisher, Christine Fox, Carl Granger, Kathy Green, Richard F. Harvey, Allen Heinemann, Ellen Julian, Elena Kardanova, Rense Lange, Alain Leplege, Mary Lunz, Anatoli Maslak, Robert Massof, Magdalena Mok, Fred Shaw, Kenneth Royal, Everett V. Smith, A. Jackson Stenner, Mark Stone, Alan Tennant, Luigi Tesio, Richard Woodcock, Weimo Zhu, and many others.

=== List of major events ===
1964: Visit to Rasch in Denmark. Intensive study with Rasch. Rasch's student, Gus Leunbach, took Wright through his Rasch model computer programs.

1965: CALFIT software written with Bruce H. Choppin and Nargis Panchapakesan, both also former physicists. CALFIT was rewritten about 1974 by Ronald Mead, a student of Wright's, with the assistance of Chris Wright, Wright's son. About the same time the name was changed to BICAL when the binomial model was added. Wright kept the software in continuous quality improvement mode until 1989, when he assumed a supervisory role and the details of software design and development were taken up by John M. Linacre. Began annual courses on Rasch measurement in U of Chicago Departments of Education and Psychology. Gave presentation on Rasch models to Midwestern Educational Research Association annual meeting.

1967: At the invitation of Benjamin Bloom, Wright presented Rasch analysis of Law School Admissions Test data at Educational Testing Service.

1969: Released new unconditional estimation algorithm and model fit statistics. Conducted a five-day workshop on Rasch measurement in Los Angeles at the first American Educational Research Association conference presession ever held; there were over 50 attendees, and Rasch gave the concluding lectures.

1977: Published early article introducing Rasch measurement innovations in educational measurement, cited 1,158 times according to Google Scholar as of 16 January 2026.

1979: Founds MESA Press and published the landmark Best Test Design with Mark Stone, cited 4,413 times according to Google Scholar as of 16 January 2026. Developed the concept of the KIDMAP and software for producing it in this period (1978–1982). The KIDMAP concept has subsequently been adopted in other fields as an intuitive way of presenting measurement results.

1980: Facilitated publication of Rasch's 1960 book by the University of Chicago Press.

1981: Organized and hosted the first International Objective Measurement Workshop. IOMW continues to be a forum for new developments in measurement theory and practice, with plans for the 20th meeting to be held at the University of California, Berkeley, in 2020.

1982: MESA Press published Rating Scale Analysis by Wright and Geofferey Masters, cited 4,049 times according to Google Scholar as of 18 November 2019.

1988: Co-founded the Rasch Measurement Special Interest Group in the American Educational Research Association with Richard M. Smith. Publication of Rasch Measurement Transactions begins, with Richard M. Smith as editor; volume 32, number 4, of this quarterly bulletin came out in late 2019.

1996: Added new features to software integrating principal components factor analysis with Rasch measurement in evaluation of unidimensionality of measures and model fit, on suggestion of John M. Linacre.

1996: Co-founded, with A. Jackson Stenner, the Institute for Objective Measurement and the http://www.Rasch.org web site; the latter continued to serve as a primary resource for information on Rasch measurement meetings, publications, software, consultants, etc.

2003: First conference celebrating Wright's lifetime career contributions, held at Rehabilitation Institute of Chicago. A selection of papers from this conference focusing on personal accounts from Wright's students and colleagues was published in 2017.

2009: Second conference celebrating Wright's work, also held at the Rehabilitation Institute of Chicago and documented in a special issue of the Journal of Applied Measurement

== Awards ==
Association of Test Publishers Career Recognition Award in Computer-Based Testing, 2001

Institute for Objective Measurement Lifetime Achievement Award, 2003

== Publications ==
About 200 journal articles – cited 231 times in 2009. 6 books and 19 monographs on measurement, 6 books on psychology 11 computer programs

=== Select publications ===
- Adams, R. J., & Wright, B. D. (1994). When does misfit make a difference? In M. Wilson (Ed.), Objective measurement: Theory into practice, Volume 2 (pp. 244–270). Norwood, New Jersey: Ablex.
- Bettelheim, B., & Wright, B. D. (1955, October). Staff development in a treatment institution. American Journal of Orthopsychiatry, XXV(4), 705–19.
- Bouchard, E., & Wright, B. D., with Protzel, M. (1997). Kinesthetic ventures: Informed by the work of F. M. Alexander, Stanislavski, Peirce, & Freud. Chicago: MESA Press.
- Fisher, W. P. Jr., & Wright, B. D. (Eds.). (1994). Applications of probabilistic conjoint measurement. International Journal of Educational Research, 21(6), 557–664.
- Granger, C. V., & Wright, B. D. (1993). Looking ahead to the use of functional assessment in ambulatory physiatric and primary care (C. V. Granger, & G. E. Gresham eds.) [Special issue]. Physical Medicine and Rehabilitation Clinics of North America: New Developments in Functional Assessment, 4(3), 595–605.
- Grosse, M. E., & Wright, B. D. (1985). Validity and reliability of true-false tests. Educational & Psychological Measurement, 45(1), 1–13.
- Grosse, M. E., & Wright, B. D. (1986, Sep). Setting, evaluating, and maintaining certification standards with the Rasch model. Evaluation & the Health Professions, 9(3), 267–285.
- Grosse, M. E., & Wright, B. D. (1988). Psychometric characteristics of scores on a patient management problem test. Educational & Psychological Measurement, 48(2), 297–305.
- Levinsohn, F. H., & Wright, B. D. (Eds.) (1976). School desegregation: Shadow and substance (pp. 1–5). Chicago: University of Chicago Press.
- Linacre, J. M., & Wright, B. D. (2002). Understanding Rasch measurement: Construction of measures from many-facet data. Journal of Applied Measurement, 3(4), 486–512.
- Masters, G. N., & Wright, B. D. (1984, Dec). The essential process in a family of measurement models. Psychometrika, 49(4), 529–544.
- Masters, G. N., & Wright, B. D. (1997). The partial credit model. In W. J. van der Linden & R. K. Hambleton (Eds.), Handbook of modern item response theory (pp. 101–21). New York: Springer-Verlag.
- Perline, R., Wright, B. D., & Wainer, H. (1979, Spring). The Rasch model as additive conjoint measurement. Applied Psychological Measurement, 3(2), 237–255.
- Townes, C. H., Merritt, F. R., & Wright, B. D. (1948). The pure rotational spectrum of ICL. Physical Review, 73, 1334–37.
- Wright, B. D. (1958, April). On behalf of a personal approach to learning. The Elementary School Journal, 58(7), 365–75.
- Wright, B. D. (1968). Introduction. In A. R. Nielsen (Ed.), Lust for learning (pp. 11–15). Thy, Denmark: New Experimental College Press.
- Wright, B. D. (1968). The Sabbath Lecture: Love and order. In A. R. Nielsen & and others (Eds.), Lust for learning (pp. 65–8). Thy, Denmark: New Experimental College Press.
- Wright, B. D. (1968). Sample-free test calibration and person measurement. In Proceedings of the 1967 invitational conference on testing problems (pp. 85–101 ). Princeton, New Jersey: Educational Testing Service.
- Wright, B. D. (1977). Misunderstanding the Rasch model. Journal of Educational Measurement, 14(3), 219–225.
- Wright, B. D. (1977). Solving measurement problems with the Rasch model. Journal of Educational Measurement, 14(2), 97–116 .
- Wright, B. D. (1984). Despair and hope for educational measurement. Contemporary Education Review, 3(1), 281–288 .
- Wright, B. D. (1985). Additivity in psychological measurement. In E. Roskam (Ed.), Measurement and personality assessment (pp. 101–112). North Holland: Elsevier Science Ltd.
- Wright, B. D. (1988, Sep). The efficacy of unconditional maximum likelihood bias correction: Comment on Jansen, Van den Wollenberg, and Wierda. Applied Psychological Measurement, 12(3), 315–318.
- Wright, B. D. (1992). The International Objective Measurement Workshops: Past and future. In M. Wilson (Ed.), Objective measurement: Theory into practice, Vol. 1 (pp. 9–28). Norwood, New Jersey: Ablex Publishing.
- Wright, B. D. (1996). Comparing Rasch measurement and factor analysis. Structural Equation Modeling, 3(1), 3–24.
- Wright, B. D. (1996). Composition analysis: Teams, packs, chains. In G. Engelhard & M. Wilson (Eds.), Objective measurement: Theory into practice, Vol. 3 (pp. 241–264 ). Norwood, New Jersey: Ablex.
- Wright, B. D. (1997, June). Fundamental measurement for outcome evaluation. Physical Medicine & Rehabilitation State of the Art Reviews, 11(2), 261–88.
- Wright, B. D. (1997, Winter). A history of social science measurement. Educational Measurement: Issues and Practice, 16(4), 33–45, 52 .
- Wright, B. D. (1999). Fundamental measurement for psychology. In S. E. Embretson & S. L. Hershberger (Eds.), The new rules of measurement: What every educator and psychologist should know (pp. 65–104 ). Hillsdale, New Jersey: Lawrence Erlbaum Associates.
- Wright, B. D. (1999). Rasch measurement models. In G. N. Masters & J. P. Keeves (Eds.), Advances in measurement in educational research and assessment (pp. 85–97). New York: Pergamon.
- Wright, B. D., & Bell, S. R. (1984, Winter). Item banks: What, why, how. Journal of Educational Measurement, 21(4), 331–345 .
- Wright, B. D., & Bettelheim, B. (1957, March). Professional identity and personal rewards in teaching. The Elementary School Journal, LVII, 297–307.
- Wright, B. D., & Douglas, G. A. (1975). Best test design and self-tailored testing. Research Memorandum No. 19. Chicago, Illinois: MESA Laboratory, Department of Education, University of Chicago
- Wright, B. D., & Douglas, G. A. (1977). Best procedures for sample-free item analysis. Applied Psychological Measurement, 1, 281–294.
- Wright, B. D., & Douglas, G. A. (1977). Conditional versus unconditional procedures for sample-free item analysis. Educational and Psychological Measurement, 37, 47–60.
- Wright, B. D., & Linacre, J. M. (1989). Observations are always ordinal; measurements, however, must be interval. Archives of Physical Medicine and Rehabilitation, 70(12), 857–867 .
- Wright, B. D., Linacre, J. M., & Heinemann, A. W. (1993). Measuring functional status in rehabilitation. Physical Medicine and Rehabilitation Clinics of North America, 4(3), 475–491C. V. Granger & G. E. Gresham (Eds.), New developments in functional assessment.
- Wright, B. D., & Masters, G. N. (1982). Rating scale analysis: Rasch measurement. Chicago, Illinois: MESA Press.
- Wright, B. D., Mead, R. J., & Bell, S. R. (1980). BICAL: Calibrating items and scales with the Rasch model. Research Memorandum 23C. Statistical Laboratory, Department of Education, The University of Chicago.
- Wright, B. D., Mead, R. J., & Ludlow, L. H. (1980). KIDMAP: person-by-item interaction mapping. MESA Memorandum #29. Statistical Laboratory, Department of Education, The University of Chicago. .
- Wright, B. D., & Mok, M. (2000). Understanding Rasch measurement: Rasch models overview. Journal of Applied Measurement, 1(1), 83–106.
- Wright, B. D., & Panchapakesan, N. (1969). A procedure for sample-free item analysis. Educational and Psychological Measurement, 29(1), 23–48.
- Wright, B. D., & Stone, M. H. (1979). Best test design: Rasch measurement. Chicago, Illinois: MESA Press.
- Wright, B. D., & Stone, M. H. (1998). Diseño de mejores pruebas [Spanish translation of Best Test Design] (R. Vidal, Trans.). Mexico City, Mexico: CENEVAL (Original work published 1979).
- Wright, B. D., & Stone, M. H. (1999). Measurement essentials. Wilmington, DE: Wide Range, Inc. .
- Wright, B. D., & Stone, M. H. (2004). Making measures. Chicago: Phaneron Press.
- Wright, B. D., & Yonke, A. M. (1989). American University Studies, Series V: Philosophy. Vol. 82: Hero, villain, saint: An adventure in the experience of individuality. New York: Peter Lang.
