= Deep South (ethnographic book) =

1941 book

Deep South: A Social Anthropological Study of Caste and Class
- Authors: Allison Davis, Burleigh B. Gardner and Mary B. Gardner.
- Language: English
- Genre: Ethnography
- Publisher: Chicago University Press
- Publication date: 1941
- Pages: xv + 558 (first edition)
- OCLC: 2709344

Deep South: A Social Anthropological Study of Caste and Class (1941) is an ethnographic study of racism in the Deep South of the United States during Jim Crow laws that analyzes the interplay between caste and social class in the region. The study was conducted undercover over 18 months by Black anthropologists Allison Davis, Elizabeth Davis, and St. Clair Drake and white anthropologists Burleigh B. Gardner and Mary B. Gardner as part of a project by W. Lloyd Warner. It is considered a foundational text in social scientific research of racial discrimination in the United States and in theorizing race as caste.

== Fieldwork ==
The fieldwork was done in Natchez, Mississippi, a part of Adams County, Mississippi, pseudonymously referred to as "Old City" and "Old County", over the course of a year and a half. Due to the segregation in the region, the research team initially consisted of a black and white couple, all of whom had studied anthropology at Harvard. Allison and Elizabeth Davis lived among the Black population and Burleigh and Mary Gardner lived among the white one. All except Mary Gardner had previously lived in the South. St. Clair Drake later joined in the fieldwork.

== Summary ==
The book is divided into two parts. The first provides an ethnographic account of the structure of the caste and class systems in the Deep South and its constituent elements. The second part focuses on interactions between the caste and class systems. The first chapter is an introduction by Warner wherein he frames the work as an attempt to turn Anthropology inward and study U.S. culture with the same impartiality and methodology used to study others. He provides a basic historical outline of the Deep South as a place built around slave plantations where a white aristocracy lived in feudal grandeur. He lays out the book as an analysis of the social system that sprang in its place, characterized by competing realms of socio-economic class and color caste.

=== Part I ===
The second chapter argues the fundamental division in the region is between white and Black people in a way indicative of a caste system; white people received larger shares of economic and social rewards and considered Black people lesser, while Black people had a larger share of onerous duties and had to show deference. Marriages or relationships between them were forbidden and membership in a group was for life.

Chapters three through seven examine socio-economic class among the white population. Chapter three provides an outline of the complex class distinctions in the region and provides breakdowns of how various socio-economic groups categorize the others. Chapters four through six examine the structure of daily activity and action of the white upper, middle, and lower class, respectively. The seventh examines cliques as social formations that shaped general life and were strongly class-typed but not exclusively, such that one may find an upper-class clique with an aspirant middle-class member. The eighth examines social mobility and mechanisms by which one's class may change among the white population.

The ninth chapter explores class among the Black population, finding that various class stratifications and tensions similarly existed in the Black community. Moreover, when the Black population discussed it, they did so euphemistically and didn't directly refer to classes due to a prevailing dogma of meritocracy.

=== Part II ===
Chapter ten explores how the caste system overlapped with tenancy relations; the mostly white landlord class used the caste system and the threat of extra-judicial violence against the mostly Black tenant and worker class. The authors differentiated between this and mob violence, noting that the same landlords and plantation owners who would threaten or enact beatings for late rent would defend against other white people jeopardizing their Black tenants. Chapter eleven further explores this, looking at day-to-day social interaction in the plantations and reciprocal relations between landlords and tenants.

Chapter twelve examines the relationship between caste and the economic system, centering its analysis around the fact that "the only type of behavior by which the society allows a colored individual to express superiority to any white individual is economic behavior." They find that in fields like storekeeping, contracting, farming, and professional services to Black people, the economic system allowed the mobility and competition to prevent rigid caste taboos, and the development of a small group of upper-class Black people. Though, in other fields, especially municipal offices, the caste barrier remains. Contrasting the city and countryside, they find that in the countryside, with its fixed caste system and planter-tenant economy, there is little terrorization of the Black caste, but in the city, with competing caste and class systems, violence and terror reached a height.

The final chapter places the region within the broader political system of the United States. It describes how the Black population was excluded from voting through physical intimidation, tax and literacy requirements, and subjective tests of comprehension of the Constitution, among other things. Moreover, commitment to maintaining the racial caste system was a key running point in elections for local government and law enforcement.

== Reception and influence ==
An abridged edition was published in 1965.

Faye V. Harrison defined it as "one of the earliest full-fledged, self-identified anthropological community studies in the US." and "perhaps the earliest to apply anthropological methods and concepts to the problem of racial inequality." She described it as a convergence of a trend started by Warner to anthropologically analyze American urban communities, the Black vindicationist tradition of W.E.B. Du Bois, and Marxist perspectives on racial and class exploitation. She argued that while it did not gain the recognition of other books such as John Dollard's Caste and Class in a Southern Town (1937) and Hortense Powdermaker's After Freedom: A Cultural Study in the Deep South (1939), it "illuminated the economic underpinnings of Southern race relations in a way no other work published around that time did".

Isabel Wilkerson, who wrote a foreword to a new edition of the book, opened it with "I have been walking in the shadow of Allison Davis for much of life", and described the work as a "landmark study" and "the most comprehensive field study to date of the American caste system. It is a brilliant, sober, compassionate, and rigorous work, not only of social science but of history, a singular document of the Jim Crow South, a testimony of a long ago era, and thus can never be duplicated." She further noted their work inspired Stokely Carmichael and Martin Luther King Jr.. She also attributed the work as a major influence on her book Caste: The Origins of Our Discontents.

David A. Varel argued that unlike most social-science studies of the era, it took an early intersectional analysis of caste and class and had striking insights about racism to maintain economic exploitation and wealth disparity among the Black community. He says that while it was overshadowed by World War II and by Black scholars who wished to emphasize the possibility of racial change, the book and its focus became an important part of the research on race and heavily influenced figures like Gunnar Myrdal, who significantly used his work in An American Dilemma. Varel stated that "as a fixture in sociology courses for decades as well as mandatory reading for young civil rights activists looking to challenge Jim Crow, Deep South became one of the most important books on race in the mid-twentieth century."

== See also ==
- Caste discrimination in the United States
- Caste#United States
