= Raiche =

Raiche or variation may refer to:

== People ==
- Alcide Raîche, mid-20th-century mayor of Shawinigan-Sud, Quebec, Canada
- Bessie Raiche née Medlar (1875–1932), U.S. businesswoman and dentist-physician
- Catherine Raiche (born 1989), gridiron football office personnel. VP of NFL Philly Eagles
- Julie Raîche, early-21st-century president of Institut québécois de planification financière (IQPF)
- Lucie Raiche, discus silver medalist for Canada at the 1976 Summer Paralympics
- Robert E. Raiche (born 1937), American politician
- Rose-de-Lima Raiche (19th century), mother of Victoria's Cross recipient Jean Brillant

== Other uses ==
- Raiche, a planemaker
- Raîche v. Canada (Attorney General), a court case about the district boundary between Miramichi—Grand Lake and Acadie—Bathurst
- Raiche's manzanita (Raiche), a subspecies and cultivar of Arctostaphylos stanfordiana

== See also ==
- Raiché Coutev Sisters, a female vocal choir, not sisters
- Rasche (surname)
- Rasch (surname)
- Raich (disambiguation)
