= William Purdy (Nebraska politician) =

American politician (1887–1961)

Member of the Nebraska Legislature
- In office January 4, 1955 – January 1, 1957
- Preceded by: Charles Wilson
- Succeeded by: David Tews

Personal details
- Born: 1887 Dakota City, Nebraska
- Died: July 8, 1961 (aged 74) Norfolk, Nebraska
- Party: Republican
- Spouse: Mary Davis (m. 1913)
- Children: 1
- Occupation: Farmer

William E. Purdy (1887 – July 8, 1961) was a Republican politician from Nebraska who served as a member of the Nebraska Legislature from 1955 to 1957.

== Early life ==
Purdy was born in Dakota City, Nebraska, in 1887. He settled in Norfolk, where he maintained a watermelon farm and raised livestock.

== Nebraska Legislature ==
In 1952, State Senator Charles Wilson ran for a third term in the 15th district, which was based in Madison and Pierce counties. Purdy challenged him for re-election. Wilson narrowly placed first in the primary election, winning 53 percent of the vote to Purdy's 47 percent. They advanced to the general election, where Wilson narrowly defeated Purdy, winning re-election 51–49 percent.

Wilson ran for a fourth term in 1954, and Purdy challenged him again, and was joined in the primary by Theodore Martell, a teacher, and Steve Gillette, the owner of a photography studio. Purdy narrowly placed first in the primary election, winning 33 percent of the vote to Wilson's 32 percent. They advanced to the general election, where Purdy narrowly defeated Wilson, winning by 36 votes.

When Robert Novak was a political correspondent for the Associated Press in Lincoln, Nebraska, he wrote a profile of Purdy. In Novak's 2007 memoir The Prince of Darkness, he wrote:

I also wrote profiles of legislators. One I remember was of a retired farmer named William Purdy, serving his first and only two-year term as the representative from Norfolk. I think I was the only reporter to interview him. Purdy was a cipher, but he was a cipher on purpose. He had campaigned for the unicameral on these pledges: to serve only one term, to make no speeches on the floor, to introduce no bills, to vote against each and every bill to increase taxes or expand government. . . . My profile of the old farmer was as snide and dismissive as AP style would allow. Over the years, however, Bill Purdy has become one of my heroes.

Purdy ran for re-election in 1956, and was challenged by attorney David Tews and former hospital administrator George Charlton. In the primary election, Purdy was the only incumbent state legislator to lose renomination. He placed third, winning 25 percent of the vote to Tews's 42 percent and Charlton's 33 percent.

In 1958, Purdy challenged Tews for re-election. Tews placed first in the primary election, winning 73 percent of the vote to Purdy's 27 percent. Tews defeated Purdy in a landslide, winning 69 percent of the vote to Purdy's 31 percent.

== Death ==
Purdy died on July 8, 1961.
