= Rasche =

Rasche is a surname of German origin. Notable people with the surname include:

- David Rasche, American actor
- Karl Emil August Rasche, SS-Obersturmbannführer
- Thea Rasche, German aviator

== See also ==
- Rasch
- Rasch model, analysis tool
- Raiche (disambiguation)
