= Burleigh B. Gardner =

American anthropologist

Burleigh Bradford Gardner (December 4, 1902—January 12, 1988) was an American social anthropologist, and Founding Chairman of Social Research Inc. of Chicago, Illinois, known for its pioneering work in the field of consumer motivation research and quantitative marketing research.

== Biography ==
Dr. Gardner grew up in Falfurrias, Texas, after his family left Galveston following the Galveston Flood in which his father lost his business. He obtained his BA in engineering from the University of Texas at Austin. He received a scholarship to Harvard University, where he first obtained his master's degree in Physical Anthropology under Earnest A. Hooton, then his PhD in Cultural Anthropology under the supervision of W. Lloyd Warner.

In the late 1920s, Gardner started his work in social science as a field worker for Warner's Department of Industrial Research at the Harvard Graduate School of Business. In 1933 he began the study of the social organization of a rural Mississippi community, together with Allison Davis and Mary R. Gardner. This resulted in 1941 of the classic book on race relations, Deep South: A Social Anthropological Study of Caste and Class in a Southern City.

During World War II he worked in the Personnel Department of Western Electric. His experience at Western Electric became the basis for the classic textbook, Human Relations in Industry, written together with David G. Moore.

In 1946, he founded the management consulting firm Social Research Inc. with several colleagues from the University of Chicago including Earl Kahn and Lee Rainwater. Early clients included Sears Roebuck & Company and the United States Air Force. He worked with psychologist Carl Rogers, sociologist W. Lloyd Warner and psychometrician Benjamin Drake Wright among others. He was the chairman of Social Research from its beginning until 1984.

Furthermore, Dr. Gardner was assistant professor of Industrial Relations at the University of Chicago, taught at Roosevelt University for many years, was board-member of the Duncan YMCA in Chicago and member of the American Marketing Association.

== Work ==
=== Social Research Inc. ===
In 1946, Social Research Inc. (SRI) was founded by the Dr. Gardner together with W. Lloyd Warner, and William Henry. All three were on the faculty at the University of Chicago. Gardner had enough of academic life and resigned to become the full time Chairman of Social Research. SRI, as it became known, was founded to apply social science techniques to create new solutions for business problems.

== Selected publications ==
Books:

- Davis, Allison, Burleigh B. Gardner, and Mary R. Gardner. Deep south: A Social Anthropological Study of Caste and Class. Chicago: University of Chicago Press, 1941.
- Gardner, Burleigh Bradford, and David G. Moore. Human relations in industry. RD Irwin, 1955.
- Gardner, Burleigh, A Conceptual Framework for Advertising, Crain Communications, Inc., Chicago, 1982.

Articles, a selection:

- Whyte, William F., and Burleigh B. Gardner. "The position and problems of the foreman." Human Organization 4.2 (1945): 17–28.
- Gardner, Burleigh B., and William Foote Whyte. "Methods for the study of human relations in industry." American Sociological Review 11.5 (1946): 506–512.
- Gardner, Burleigh B. "The factory as a social system." in: Whyte, William Foote (Ed), (1946). Industry and society. pp. 4–20.
- Gardner, Burleigh B., and Sidney J. Levy. "The product and the brand." Harvard Business Review 33.2 (1955): 33–39.
- Gardner, Burleigh B. "The package as a communication." Marketing for Tomorrow... Today, Chicago: American Marketing Association 25 (1967): 117–118.
