= Rasch model estimation =

Estimation of a Rasch model is used to estimate the parameters of the Rasch model. Various techniques are employed to estimate the parameters from matrices of response data. The most common approaches are types of maximum likelihood estimation, such as joint and conditional maximum likelihood estimation. Joint maximum likelihood (JML) equations are efficient, but inconsistent for a finite number of items, whereas conditional maximum likelihood (CML) equations give consistent and unbiased item estimates. Person estimates are generally thought to have bias associated with them, although weighted likelihood estimation methods for the estimation of person parameters reduce the bias.

== Rasch model ==
The Rasch model for dichotomous data takes the form:

$$\Pr \{X_{ni}=1\}=\frac{\exp({\beta_n} - {\delta_i})}{1 + \exp({\beta_n} - {\delta_i})},$$

where $\beta_n$ is the ability of person $n$ and $\delta_i$ is the difficulty of item $i$.

== Joint maximum likelihood ==
Let $x_{ni}$ denote the observed response for person n on item i. The probability of the observed data matrix, which is the product of the probabilities of the individual responses, is given by the likelihood function

$$\Lambda = \frac{\prod_{n} \prod_{i} \exp(x_{ni}(\beta_n-\delta_i))}{\prod_{n} \prod_{i}(1+\exp(\beta_n-\delta_i))}.$$

The log-likelihood function is then

$$\log \Lambda = \sum_n^N \beta_n r_n - \sum_i^I \delta_i s_i - \sum_n^N \sum_i^I \log(1+\exp(\beta_n-\delta_i))$$

where $r_n=\sum_i^I x_{ni}$ is the total raw score for person n, $s_i=\sum_n^N x_{ni}$ is the total raw score for item i, N is the total number of persons and I is the total number of items.

Solution equations are obtained by taking partial derivatives with respect to $\delta_i$ and $\beta_n$ and setting the result equal to 0. The JML solution equations are:

$$s_i = \sum_{n=1}^N p_{ni},\quad i=1,\dots,I$$

$$r_n = \sum_{i=1}^I p_{ni},\quad n=1,\dots,N$$

where $p_{ni}=\exp(\beta_n-\delta_i)/(1+\exp(\beta_n-\delta_i))$.

The resulting estimates are biased, and no finite estimates exist for persons with score 0 (no correct responses) or with 100% correct responses (perfect score). The same holds for items with extreme scores, no estimates exists for these as well. This bias is due to a well known effect described by Kiefer & Wolfowitz (1956). It is of the order $(I-1)/I$, and a more accurate (less biased) estimate of each $\delta_i$ is obtained by multiplying the estimates by $(I-1)/I$.

== Conditional maximum likelihood ==
The conditional likelihood function is defined as

$$\Lambda = \prod_{n} \Pr\{(x_{ni})\mid r_n\} =\frac{\exp(\sum_i -s_i\delta_i)}{\prod_{n} \gamma_r}$$

in which

$$\gamma_r = \sum_{(x) \mid r}\exp(-\sum_i x_{ni}\delta_i)$$

is the elementary symmetric function of order r, which represents the sum over all combinations of r items. For example, in the case of three items,

$$\gamma_2 = \exp(-\delta_1-\delta_2)+\exp(-\delta_1-\delta_3)+\exp(-\delta_2-\delta_3).$$

Details can be found in the chapters by von Davier (2016) for the dichotomous Rasch model and von Davier & Rost (1995) for the polytomous Rasch model.

== Estimation algorithms ==
Some kind of expectation-maximization algorithm is used in the estimation of the parameters of Rasch models. Algorithms for implementing Maximum Likelihood estimation commonly employ Newton–Raphson iterations to solve for solution equations obtained from setting the partial derivatives of the log-likelihood functions equal to 0. Convergence criteria are used to determine when the iterations cease. For example, the criterion might be that the mean item estimate changes by less than a certain value, such as 0.001, between one iteration and another for all items.

== See also ==
- Expectation-maximization algorithm
- Rasch model
