= Charles Wilson (Nebraska politician) =

American politician (1900–1967)

Member of the Nebraska Legislature from the 15th district
- In office January 4, 1949 – January 4, 1955
- Preceded by: Ernest Raasch
- Succeeded by: William Purdy

Personal details
- Born: January 5, 1900 Ord, Nebraska
- Died: October 19, 1967 (aged 67) Norfolk, Nebraska
- Party: Democratic
- Spouse: Esther Plejdrup
- Children: 1
- Occupation: Farmer, construction worker, contractor

Charles Wilson (January 5, 1900 – October 19, 1967) was a Democratic politician from Nebraska who served as a member of the Nebraska Legislature from the 15th district from 1949 to 1955.

== Early life ==
Wilson was born in Ord, Nebraska, in 1900. He lived in Norfolk and worked as a contractor and concrete product manufacturer.

== Nebraska Legislature ==
In 1948, Wilson sought the Republican nomination for the Madison County Commission. However, five minutes before the filing deadline, he opted to challenge incumbent State Senator Ernest Raasch, who represented the 15th district, for re-election. In the nonpartisan primary, Wilson placed first over Raasch by a wide margin, receiving 60 percent of the vote to Raasch's 40 percent. They advanced to the general election, but on August 27, 1948, Raasch dropped out of the race, citing his inability to deal with the "financial loss this office carries with it." As a result, Wilson won the race unopposed.

Wilson ran for re-election to a second term in 1950, and was re-elected unopposed.

In 1952, Wilson ran for a third term. He was challenged by farmer William Purdy. In the primary election, Wilson narrowly placed first over Purdy, receiving 53 percent of the vote. In the general election, Wilson narrowly won re-election, defeating Purdy with 51 percent of the vote.

Wilson ran for a fourth term in 1954, and was challenged by Purdy, teacher Theodore Martell, and photography studio owner Steve Gillette. In the primary election, Wilson narrowly placed second, receiving 32 percent of the vote to Purdy's 33 percent. Purdy narrowly defeated Wilson in the general election, winning by 36 votes.

== Death ==
Wilson died on October 19, 1967.
