= Lynn Hutton =

American politician (1897–1964)

Member of the Nebraska Legislature from the 15th district
- In office March 27, 1944 – January 2, 1945
- Preceded by: H. G. Greenamyre
- Succeeded by: Ernest Raasch

Personal details
- Born: November 8, 1897 Egan, South Dakota
- Died: January 1, 1964 (aged 66) Norfolk, Nebraska
- Party: Republican
- Spouse: Bonnie L. Buck (m. 1922)
- Children: 2
- Education: South Dakota State College (B.S., M.S.); George Washington University Law School (LL.B.)
- Occupation: Lawyer

Lynn D. Hutton (November 8, 1897 – January 1, 1964) was a Republican politician and attorney from Nebraska who served as a member of the Nebraska Legislature from the 15th district from 1944 to 1945.

== Early life ==
Hutton was born in Egan, South Dakota, in 1897, and attended South Dakota State College, graduating with his bachelor's degree in 1919 and his master's degree in 1923. He later attended the George Washington University Law School, receiving his master of laws in 1927. Hutton served as the Norfolk City Attorney.

== Nebraska Legislature ==
In 1943, Governor Dwight Griswold appointed State Senator H. G. Greenamyre to serve as his secretary. Griswold did not plan to appoint a successor until a special legislative session was called in 1944, and he appointed Hutton to serve out the remainder of Greenamyre's term. Hutton was sworn in on March 27, 1944, and declined to run for a full term.

== Post-legislative career ==
In 1947, Governor Val Peterson appointed Hutton to the Nebraska Game Commission, Following the death of Congressman Karl Stefan in 1951, Hutton was seen as a possible Republican candidate for the special election to fill Stefan's seat, but ultimately declined to run.

== Death ==
Hutton died on January 1, 1964.
