= David Tews =

American politician (1930–2007)

Member of the Nebraska Legislature from the 15th district
- In office January 1, 1957 – January 3, 1961
- Preceded by: William Purdy
- Succeeded by: H. L. Gerhart

Personal details
- Born: January 24, 1930 Norfolk, Nebraska
- Died: October 31, 2007 (aged 77) Knoxville, Tennessee
- Party: Republican
- Spouse: Helen McAllister Tews
- Children: 7
- Education: Norfolk Junior College; University of Nebraska College of Law
- Occupation: Real estate developer, lobbyist, consultant, attorney

Military service
- Allegiance: United States
- Branch/service: Nebraska Air National Guard
- Years of service: 1951–1952

David Dean Tews (January 24, 1930 – October 31, 2007) was an American Republican politician and lobbyist who served as a member of the Nebraska Legislature from the 15th district from 1957 to 1961.

== Early life ==
Tews was born in Norfolk, Nebraska, in 1930. He graduated from Norfolk High School, and attended Norfolk Junior College and the University of Nebraska College of Law. After graduation, he began his practice in Norfolk, and formed the law firm of Reeker and Tews with his step-father, former Madison County Judge Ernest Reeker.

== Nebraska Legislature ==
In 1956, State Senator William Purdy ran for re-election in the 15th district, which included Madison and Pierce counties. Tews, along with George Charlton, the former superintendent of the Norfolk State Hospital, ran against Purdy in the nonpartisan primary. Tews ran for the state legislature from the In the primary election, Tews placed first, winning 42 percent of the vote to Charlton's 33 percent and Purdy's 25 percent. Purdy was the only incumbent senator to lose renomination that year, and Tews and Charlton advanced to the general election. Tews defeated Charlton in a landslide, winning 68–32 percent.

Tews ran for re-election in 1958, and was challenged by Purdy. He placed first over Purdy in the primary by a wide margin, receiving 73 percent of the vote. In the general election, he defeated Purdy by a wide margin, winning re-election 69–31 percent.

== Post-legislative career ==
In 1960, Tews announced that he would run for the Ninth Judicial District rather than seek re-election, and simultaneously ran as a delegate to the 1960 Republican National Convention from the 3rd congressional district. However, he ultimately dropped out of the race, citing his ongoing studies at the University of Nebraska.

After leaving the legislature, he worked as a lobbyist and in real estate development. Tews was active in Republican politics and was a friend and ally of George Bush. In the 1980s, he moved to Washington, D.C., in the 1980s, and started D&H Consulting, an international business consulting firm.

== Death ==
Tews died on October 31, 2007.
