= H. L. Gerhart =

American politician (1897–1989)

Member of the Nebraska Legislature from the 15th district
- In office January 3, 1961 – January 5, 1965
- Preceded by: David Tews
- Succeeded by: Ross Rasmussen (redistricted)

Personal details
- Born: December 17, 1897 Newman Grove, Nebraska
- Died: June 19, 1989 (aged 91) Norfolk, Nebraska
- Party: Republican
- Spouse: Dorothy Hallgren (m. 1927)
- Children: 2 (Harold L. Jr., Mary)
- Parent: Edwin H. Gerhart (father)
- Education: University of Nebraska
- Occupation: Banker

Harold L. Gerhart (December 17, 1897 – June 19, 1989) was a Republican politician from Nebraska who served as a member of the Nebraska Legislature from the 15th district from 1961 to 1965.

== Early life ==
Gerhart was born in Newman Grove, Nebraska, in 1897. He attended the University of Nebraska. He served in the military during World War I, and later attended the University of Nebraska, graduating with his bachelor's degree in 1920.

Upon graduation, he worked for the First National Bank of Newman Grove, where his father served as the president. Upon the death of his father in 1944, he became the president of the bank. Gerhart was elected the Mayor of Newman Grove in 1956, and was re-elected in 1958.

== Nebraska Legislature ==
In 1960, State Senator David Tews declined to seek re-election, and Gerhart ran to succeed him in the 15th district, which included Madison and Pierce counties. In the nonpartisan primary, Gerhart faced Robert Garsson, the publisher of the Madison Star-Mail. Though the contest was formally nonpartisan, both Gerhart and Garsson were Republicans. Gerhart placed first in the primary by a wide margin, receiving 66 percent of the vote to Garsson's 34 percent. In the general election, Gerhart defeated Garsson in a landslide, winning 68–32 percent.

Gerhart ran for re-election in 1962, and was challenged by Alvin Massman, the president of the Battle Creek School Board. In the primary election, Gerhart placed first over Massman, winning 61 percent of the vote to Massman's 39 percent. They advanced to the general election, where Gerhart ultimately defeated Massman, winning re-election with 57 percent of the vote.

In 1964, Gerhart declined to seek re-election.

== Death ==
Gerhart died on June 19, 1989.
