= Ernest Raasch =

American politician (1879–1954)

Member of the Nebraska Legislature from the 15th district
- In office January 2, 1945 – January 4, 1949
- Preceded by: Lynn Hutton
- Succeeded by: Charles Wilson

Personal details
- Born: August 7, 1879 near Norfolk, Nebraska
- Died: May 27, 1954 (aged 74) Norfolk, Nebraska
- Party: Republican
- Spouse: Esther Martin (m. 1924)
- Children: 4
- Occupation: Farmer, businessman

Ernest Raasch (August 7, 1879 – May 27, 1954) was a Republican politician from Nebraska who served as a member of the Nebraska Legislature from the 15th district from 1945 to 1949.

== Early life ==
Raasch was born near Norfolk, Nebraska, on August 7, 1879. After completing his public school education, Raasch took up farming, and later entered the real estate and insurance business.

== Nebraska Legislature ==
In 1944, Raasch ran for the Madison County Commission in the Republican primary, However, he instead opted to run for the state legislature from the 15th district, which included Madison and Pierce counties, observing ash "everyone in town and the countryside is seeking" the county commission race. H. G. Greenamyre, who was elected to represent the 15th district in 1942, resigned in 1943 to become the secretary to Governor Dwight Griswold, and his appointed successor, Lynn Hutton, declined to run in the election.

Raasch faced banker A. F. Magdanz, real estate investor George Northouse, businessman Max Puschendorf, and rural schools advocate Gladys Weiler in the nonpartisan primary. Raasch placed second in the primary election, winning 26 percent of the vote to Magdanz's 36 percent, and they advanced to the general election. Raasch ultimately defeated Magdanz by a narrow margin, winning 53–47 percent.

In 1946, Raasch ran for a second term, and was challenged for re-election by Weiler. In the primary election, Raasch placed first over Weiler, winning 61 percent of the vote to Weiler's 39 percent. In the general election, Raasch defeated her by a narrow margin, winning re-election 53–47 percent.

Raasch ran for a third term in 1948, and was challenged by contractor Charles Wilson. Wilson placed first in the primary, winning 60 percent of the vote to Raasch's 40 percent. Prior to the general election, Raasch dropped out of the race, however, stating that he was unable to suffer the "financial loss" that serving in the legislature required, and Wilson was elected unopposed.

== Death ==
Raasch died on May 27, 1954.
