= H. G. Greenamyre =

American politician (1904–1959)

Member of the Nebraska Legislature from the 15th district
- In office January 7, 1941 – June 14, 1943
- Preceded by: Carl H. Peterson
- Succeeded by: Lynn Hutton

Personal details
- Born: June 26, 1904 Cheney, Nebraska
- Died: May 2, 1959 (aged 54) Lincoln, Nebraska
- Cause of death: Car accident
- Party: Republican
- Spouse: Lois Logan Hunt (m. 1938)
- Children: 2
- Education: University of Nebraska College of Law
- Occupation: Attorney

Harlan Gregg Greenamyre (June 26, 1904 – May 2, 1959) was a Republican politician from Nebraska who served as a member of the Nebraska Legislature from the 15th district from 1941 to 1943. He died in a car accident in Lincoln, Nebraska.

== Early life ==
Greenamyre was born in Cheney, Nebraska, an unincorporated community outside of Lincoln, in 1904. He grew up outside of Brunswick, and graduated from the University of Nebraska with his bachelor of laws degree. Greenamyre was admitted to the state bar in 1927, and initially began practicing law in Springview.

In 1929, following the resignation of the Keya Paha County Attorney, Greenamyre was appointed to serve out the remaining year of his term. He ran for re-election in 1930 as the Republican nominee and won unopposed. After winning re-election in 1934, he resigned on May 1, 1935, to move to Norfolk to practice law.

== Nebraska Legislature ==
In 1940, State Senator Carl H. Peterson ran for re-election to a third term, and Greenamyre ran against him in the 15th district, which included Madison and Pierce counties. Greenamyre placed first in the nonpartisan primary, winning 30 percent of the vote to Peterson's 27 percent. In the general election, Greenamyre defeated Peterson in a landslide, winning 66 percent of the vote to Peterson's 34 percent.

Greenamyre ran for re-election in 1942, and was re-elected unopposed.

In 1943, Greenamyre resigned from the legislature, effective June 14, 1943, to serve as the personal secretary to Governor Dwight Griswold. Griswold did not originally plan on filling Greenamyre's seat, but once he called a special session, he appointed Lynn Hutton to serve out the remaining months.

== Post-legislative career ==
Greenamyre served as Griswold's personal secretary until 1945, when he resigned to form a law firm with Ira Beynon in Lincoln. Shortly thereafter, he was appointed to a vacant seat on the Consumers Public Power District Board of Directors. Greenamyre was elected to a full term on the board in 1946, and served until his death in 1959.

== Death ==
Greenamyre died on May 2, 1959, in a three-car automobile collision in Lincoln, Nebraska.
