= Anthony Rasch =

German-American silversmith

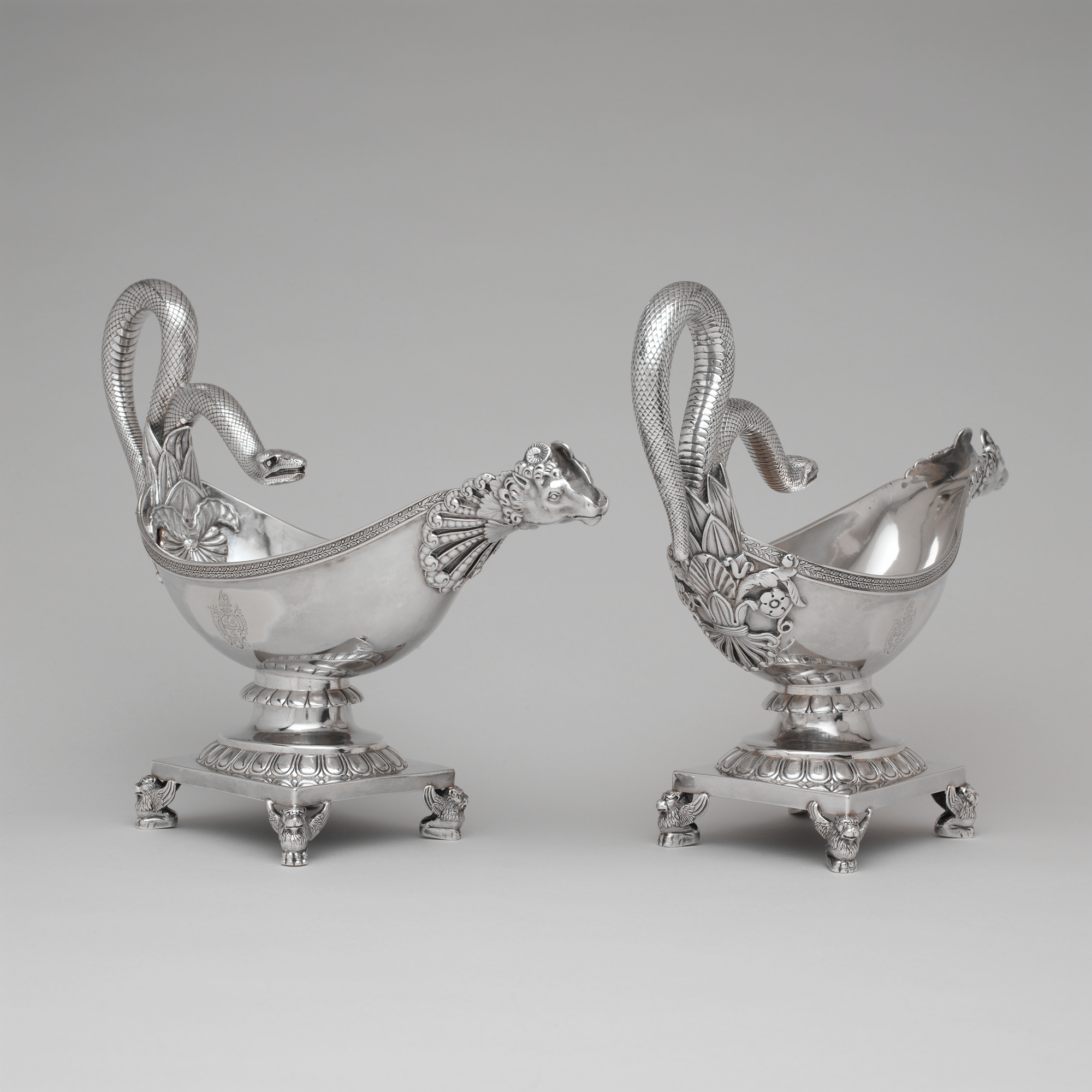
Sauceboats by Anthony Rasch, circa 1815

Anthony Rasch von Tauffkirchen (c. 1778 - November 25, 1858) was a German-American silversmith, active in Philadelphia (1804-1820) and New Orleans (1820-1858). According to the Metropolitan Museum of Art, his works are credited with being "among the most sophisticated silver vessels produced in the United States in the early nineteenth century."

Rasch was born in Bavaria, probably in the Schloss Kleeberg, as the second son of Maximilian, Count von Tauffkirchen, and his third wife, Gertrude. He trained as a goldsmith in Germany before arriving in Philadelphia, with his wife, on April 16, 1804. By 1806 Rasch had joined the Holy Trinity Catholic Church, and by 1807 he began working in the shop of French émigré silversmith and retailer Jean-Simon Chaudron (1758–1846). In 1809 they became partners as Chaudron & Rasch, with Rasch running their manufactory on the Schuylkill River and Chaudron running the retail shop in Philadelphia. The 1810 federal census recorded 27 people living and working at Rasch's manufactory, the largest household in the township. The partners created sterling silverware sold as far away as New York and Virginia, usually stamped with two banner marks, "CHAUDRON'S & RASCH" and "STER•AMERI•MAN•" (an abbreviation for "Sterling, American Manufacture.")

After their partnership dissolved in 1812, Rasch relocated to 118 High Street, where he created his own maker's mark and sterling standard mark, "ANTY. RASCH" and "STERLING SILR." He dropped the sterling quality mark after two years but continued to mark his pieces "ANTY. RASCH" into 1817.

By 1817 Rasch was partnered with George Willig Jr. (ca. 1795–c. 1860), likely a journeyman in Rasch's shop, as A. Rasch & Co.. Their business flourished as they made large, handwrought sterling silver pieces in "either French or English taste," with applied cast ornament for customers in Boston, Maryland, and Philadelphia. They also made more affordable goods such as cups, goblets, and flatware, and retailed silver from France, Sheffield plate, and Saratoga water. However, the Panic of 1819 ruined them and in July 1819 they declared insolvency. In September they auctioned off their tools and household goods.

In November 1819 Rasch moved to New Orleans. There he advertised his new business in January 1820, proposing to execute "conformably to either FRENCH or ENGLISH taste: complete setts or services of Silver Ware" and asking "of a generous public that portion of patronage to which his skill as a workman and conduct as a citizen may entitle him." He was both a craftsman and merchant. In March 1821 he supplied the city of New Orleans with 200 street lamps for which he was paid $900 in May 1822. He also sold Saratoga water (1826) and the "celebrated Harrodsburgh Mineral Water" (1827). His shop and residence were in the Vieux Carré, from 1831 onwards at 75 (now 315) Chartres Street. In those years, Rasch often traveled to purchase goods for resale, including voyages to England, France, and Geneva. A cargo list from Rasch's 1829 trip to France includes eighteen cases, four trunks, two boxes, and one barrel of merchandise. In 1831 Rasch exhibited an elaborate musical clock made by Pierre Frédéric Ingold and Frères Rochat:

SPLENDID MECHANISM — Mr. A. Rasch, well known to our citizens for his enterprise, has imported from France a most splendid clock, made in Paris by a Genevean [sic] about 70 years of age. It may be seen at his store....The whole is a finished, very ingenious and costly piece of work, well worthy the attention of the curious.

The Panic of 1837 forced Rasch into a second bankruptcy. In 1842 he applied for relief from his creditors, and in 1845 his home, property, and most of his belongings were sold at public auction. However, his sons-in-law bought his slaves, home, and shop, and supported him for the remainder of his life. He returned to making silver. On January 20, 1849, Rasch advertised that "he continues to manufacture every variety of Gold and Silver Ware, and to set Diamonds in the most approved style." He was buried in Saint Louis Cemetery No. 1 in New Orleans.

His work is collected in the Art Institute of Chicago, Metropolitan Museum of Art, and the Museum of Fine Arts, Houston.
