= Robert Raich =

American lawyer

Robert Raich is an American attorney. He served as legal counsel in the only two medical cannabis cases heard by the United States Supreme Court: United States v. Oakland Cannabis Buyers' Cooperative in 2001 and Gonzales v. Raich in 2004. His spouse at the time, Angel Raich, was a party in the latter case. In 1995, he became one of the founders of California Proposition 215, the initiative that created the first medical cannabis framework in the United States. Raich has been an instructor at Oaksterdam University, where he teaches "how to create defenses against possible hostile action by the government" for students of the cannabis industry.
