= Allison S. Davis =

American lawyer

Allison S. Davis is a Chicago lawyer and real estate developer.

Davis was the senior partner of Davis, Miner, Barnhill & Galland, a law firm founded in 1971 that was involved in civil rights litigation and neighborhood economic development work but provided legal services to individual and corporate clients also.

In 2003, Davis was appointed to the Illinois State Board of Investment by Illinois Governor Rod Blagojevich.

Davis is the son of Allison Davis Sr., the late University of Chicago professor of social anthropology.
