= Allison Davis (anthropologist) =

American anthropologist, writer, and scholar

- Born: William Boyd Allison Davis; October 14, 1902; Washington, D.C., U.S.
- Died: November 21, 1983 (aged 81); Chicago, Illinois, U.S.
- Education: Williams College (BA); Harvard University (MA, Anthropology); Harvard University (MA, Comparative Literature); University of Chicago (PhD Anthropology)
- Occupations: Academic, anthropologist, educator
- Spouses: Alice Elizabeth Stubbs Davis (m. 1929; died 1966); Lois L. Mason (m. 1969–1983)
- Writing career
- Notable works: Deep South (1941), Children of Bondage (1940)
- Movement: The Harlem Renaissance

William Boyd Allison Davis (October 14, 1902 – November 21, 1983) was an American educator, anthropologist, writer, researcher, and scholar who became the third African American to hold a full faculty position at a major white university when he joined the staff of the University of Chicago in 1942, after only Dr. Patrick Healy and George F. Grant, where he served for the remainder of his academic life. He was considered one of the most promising black scholars of his generation.

Among his students during his tenure at the University of Chicago were anthropologists St. Clair Drake and sociologist Nathan Hare. Davis, who has been honored with a commemorative postage stamp by the United States Postal Service, is best remembered for his pioneering anthropology research on southern race, caste, and class during the 1930s, his research on intelligence quotient tests in the 1940s and 1950s, and his support of "compensatory education," an area in which he contributed to the intellectual genesis of the federal Head Start Program.

== Biography ==
=== Family history ===
Born in 1902 as the first child of John Abraham Davis and Gabrielle Dorothy Beale-Davis, William Boyd Allison Davis, who would later be known as Allison Davis, was raised in an affluent family well-acquainted with both achievement and activism. He had a younger sister, Dorothy, and a younger brother, John Aubrey Davis, Sr. Davis's grandfather had been an abolitionist lawyer. His father held a managerial position in the Government Printing Office, and named Davis after Iowa senator William Boyd Allison, who was instrumental in his securing an appointment in that office. Davis' father was later demoted under the segregation policies of President Woodrow Wilson's administration, losing nearly two-thirds of his salary and the family's affluent status.

His father also chaired the anti-lynching committee of Washington D.C.'s chapter of the NAACP. Thus, he was a leader in his community, and Davis would describe him as a "brave man" who was "already marked in a town of 236 citizens" as a large landowner who "further angered whites by registering and voting." This contrasted sharply with the elitism of many upper-class African Americans, whom Davis would criticize throughout his life for their lack of leadership in the struggle for racial equality and attempts to distance themselves from lower-class blacks.

=== Early education and university studies ===
Davis entered Washington D.C.'s prestigious Dunbar High School in 1916 and, like his father before him, graduated as its valedictorian. The school had been founded almost a half-century before, making it the nation's oldest public black high school, and had since developed a reputation that pulled black families to the nation's capital for the chief purpose of gaining residency within the school district. Bucking national trends, the school had settled firmly in the Du Bois camp regarding black education and offered a rigorous college preparatory curriculum that included Greek and Latin. Though the quality of black colleges would steadily increase through the mid-century, at the time of Davis's graduation most were still teaching primary and secondary curricula; the ticket to the white post-graduate program was most often through the white university. Williams College had a singular arrangement with Dunbar that allotted one full merit-based scholarship called the Horace F. Clark Prize Fellowship per year to the valedictorian. From this agreement Williams derived the majority of its black cohort, and in 1920 drew Davis into its ranks by graduating first in his class at Dunbar.

Davis excelled at Williams, graduating as valedictorian in 1924 with a degree in English summa cum laude as well as membership in Phi Beta Kappa. During his studies, he gravitated toward the poetry of Robert Frost, whose stoic depiction of working-class people resembled his own admiration for their resilience and adaptability. Though Williams offered a racially integrated classroom environment and had a tradition of supporting the early abolitionist movement, Davis and other black students endured segregation in campus housing; during his years there, the few black students were forced to live together to avoid the possible scandal that could accompany housing them with white students, and they were not permitted to attend social events on campus. Nonetheless, the atmosphere at Williams was relatively progressive for its time, and Davis got along well with many of his white peers, among whom were several Southerners. He also became close friends with Sterling Brown, a fellow Dunbar alumnus, who later recalled the instances of prejudice and social isolation he and other black students endured while at Williams in his essay "Oh Didn't He Ramble." In spite of an excellent academic performance and amicable relationships with peers and faculty, Davis was rejected for a teaching assistant position upon graduation in 1924 under the pretext that the school had too many Southern students to permit his appointment.

=== Marriages ===
On June 23, 1929, Davis married Alice Elizabeth Stubbs, a Mount Holyoke College graduate, who played an instrumental role in the research and publication of both his works Children of Bondage and Deep South. They had two sons, Allison Stubbs Davis, a Chicago attorney, and Gordon Jamison Davis, New York City parks commissioner and attorney. Alice died in 1966.

Davis later married Lois L. Mason on January 7, 1969.

=== Death ===
Davis died in 1983 due to cardiac related illness.

== Literary focus: Harvard, Hampton, and the Harlem Renaissance ==
=== Harvard ===
With his post-graduation ambitions at Williams frustrated, in 1924 Davis entered Harvard University on a scholarship, where he earned his master's degree in literature a year later. Among his professors were the well-known literary critics Bliss Perry and George Lyman Kittredge. However, the most influential intellectual tradition that Davis encountered during his year there came from Irving Babbitt and his New Humanism, in which he saw similarities with his own disdain for the materialistic culture of the black upper classes and the lack of moral leadership among blacks on a national level. This criticism recurred in his work in the late 1920s and early thirties when he participated actively in the explosion of black literature and culture known as the New Negro Renaissance.

=== Hampton ===
After graduation, the reality of finding a job in academics set in. Few universities would hire an African American teacher, so Davis's choices were limited. In the fall of 1925 he began teaching at the Hampton Institute, later Hampton University, one of the many Historically Black Colleges and Universities HBCU throughout the South. Davis realized that a cultural barrier separated him from his students, many of whom came from the most acutely segregated regions of the Deep South and lacked the rigorous academic training and privileged upbringing that he had enjoyed. This division, along with the paternalistic attitude of the Institute which manifested in the form of a strictly regimented campus life and an adherence to segregationist policies, frustrated him and eventually would drive him to change his academic focus from the arts to social sciences in a bid to make a greater impact on society. In the meantime, he fought the most egregious injustices at the Institute by helping students who were organizing a petition with a list of demands to the administration. The protest was quashed, but Davis continued to support a small group of promising students who grew to admire his work, among whom was St. Clair Drake, who was to make important contributions to Davis's research during the 1930s for Deep South and who later became an important anthropologist in his own right.

=== Harlem Renaissance ===
While at Hampton between 1925 and 1931, he remained actively involved in the literature of what was then known as the "New Negro Renaissance." Likewise, in 1927 he published "In Glorious Company," a narrative essay which describes a group of working-class blacks during their train ride North. This piece displayed his unique literary voice based on respect for the resilience of ordinary blacks who endured injustices every day, while at the same time it avoided an excessively romanticized depiction of African-American life or a reliance on realism as a way to scandalize the reader. This was a departure from many previous writers of the Renaissance who depicted success in the black struggle as part of an effort to highlight the artistic achievements of their race. Davis's approach, which David Varel identifies in the tradition of "Negro Stoicism," combined elements of Babbitt's New Humanism as well as his own belief that literature should focus on uplifting ordinary blacks. During the same period he regularly corresponded with W.E.B. Du Bois and published several pieces in The Crisis, including the poems "To Those Dead and Gone" and "Gospel for Those Who Must," always centered on the theme of perseverance in the lives of poor blacks. However, his most notable work during this era was the polarizing 1929 essay "The Negro Deserts His People," in which he harshly criticized the black bourgeoisie for having abandoned the masses in their struggle for equality; the concern of class stratification continued to guide his work throughout his career, as he transitioned from the arts to social science in the early 30s and sought to directly confront class differences in the black community.

== Transition to anthropology ==
=== Return to Harvard ===
By the late 1920s, Davis sought other ways to effect change on a broader scale, and he began to seek funding for an anthropological study of African Americans and their folk culture by studying its African roots, perhaps interested by the emphasis on pan-Africanism that emerged during the Renaissance. He corresponded with Bronisław Malinowski at the London School of Economics and Dietrich Westermann of the University of Berlin regarding funding to study in Europe, but eventually he decided to return first to Harvard for his M.A. in anthropology, which he did in the fall of 1931. While studying at Harvard, Davis participated in Lloyd Warner's research for his study of Yankee City, where he helped interview the town's black residents. The project dissected the social life of a New England town by dividing it into six social classes, which Warner maintained were reinforced by social cliques in which one's social class determined which cliques one had access to. Warner's theory of social classes would significantly shape Davis's thinking, and the two would later work together on the Deep South project. After gaining his M.A in 1932, Davis returned to the London School of Economics with a fellowship from the Julius Rosenwald Fund. Mentored by Malinowski and Launcelot Hogben, Davis continued his studies in anthropology. In 1933, Davis traveled back to Harvard to serve as the Co-Director of Harvard's Anthropological Field Research for the next two years.

=== Early anthropology work ===
Davis taught anthropology at Dillard University from 1935 to 1939. It was there that he embarked upon a major course of fieldwork—in collaboration with Yale psychologist John Dollard and supported by the American Youth Commission of the American Council on Education. Davis studied black adolescents in both New Orleans and Natchez, Mississippi, for three years, then spent a year as a research fellow at the Institute of Human Relations at Yale, after which he and Dollard published their joint research results in a book entitled, Children of Bondage: The Personality Development of Negro Youth in the Urban South (1940).

== University of Chicago ==
Davis went on to earn a PhD in anthropology from the University of Chicago, where he was offered a full teaching position. The conditions for his employment were that the Rosenwald Fund would subsidize most of his three year position. He was awarded two fellowships in 1939 and 1940. After six years of working as an Assistant professor of Education, Davis was awarded tenure, the first black professor to ever win tenure at a major northern university. Davis worked at the University of Chicago for over two decades before retiring in 1970.

== Brown v Board of Education ==
Davis’ research also had a real impact on social policy and was part of the proceedings in Brown v. Board of Education. Before the submission of the second brief to the Supreme Court in 1953 the NAACP Legal Defense Fund held a three day conference to critique the brief and the position papers to be submitted. Davis was one of the participants who critiqued the brief.

== Awards ==
In 1971, Davis was awarded the Education Journal Educator of the Year.

In 1977, the Columbia Teachers College awarded him the Distinguished Service Medal Recipient. He also received the Solomon Carter Fuller Award winner from the American Psychiatric Association.

From 1978–1980 and 1981–1982, Davis was the Spencer Foundation Grantee.

== Legacy ==
Davis's commitment to increasing access to quality education for low-income children revolutionized policy and paved the way for compensatory education programs such as Head Start and affirmative action.

In 1974, Williams College bestowed an honorary degree upon Davis. In 2012, the college renamed its multicultural center the Davis Center in honor of Allison Davis and his younger brother John A. Davis, alumni of the classes of 1924 and 1933 respectively.

Davis is depicted on a United States postage stamp issued on February 1, 1994. He is also depicted with his wife in the 2023 film Origin by Ava DuVernay.

== Bibliography of works by Allison Davis ==
- Davis, A. (1939). The Socialization of the American Negro Child and Adolescent. The Journal of Negro Education, 8(3), 264–274. https://doi.org/10.2307/2292628.
- Davis, A. (1941). American Status Systems and the Socialization of the Child. American Sociological Review, 6(3), 345–356. https://doi.org/10.2307/2086191.
- Davis, A & Havighurst, R. J. (1943). Child Socialization and the School. Review of Educational Research, 13(1), 29–37. https://doi.org/10.2307/1168808.
- Davis, A., & Havighurst, R. J. (1945). Human Development and Intergroup Education. The Journal of Educational Sociology, 18(9), 535–541. https://doi.org/10.2307/2263099.
- Davis, A., & Havighurst, R. J. (1946). Social Class and Color Differences in Child-Rearing. American Sociological Review, 11(6), 698–710. https://doi.org/10.2307/2087065.
- Davis, A & Havighurst, R. J. (1955). A Comparison of the Chicago and Harvard Studies of Social Class Differences in Child Rearing. American Sociological Review, 20(4), 438–442. https://doi.org/10.2307/2092743.
- Davis, A. (1963). Relationships between achievement in high school, college and occupation; a follow-up study [by] Allison Davis and Robert Hess, with the assistance of Jack Forman and others. University of Chicago 1963. hdl:2027/mdp.39015004280775.
- Davis, A. (1964). Children of bondage; the personality development of Negro youth in the urban South, by Allison Davis and John Dollard. Harper torchbooks. Harper & Row.
- Davis, A. (1983). Leadership, love, and aggression. Harcourt Brace Jovanovich. ISBN 978-0-15-149348-7.
- Davis, A. (2022). Deep south: a social anthropological study of caste and class / Allison Davis, Burleigh B. Gardner, Mary R. Gardner. University of Chicago Press. ISBN 978-0-226-81799-6.
