= Georg Rasch =

Danish mathematician

- Born: September 21, 1901
- Died: October 19, 1980 (aged 79)
- Education: University of Copenhagen (BS, MS, PhD)
- Known for: Rasch model
- Scientific career
- Fields: Psychometrics, Statistics, Mathematics
- Doctoral advisor: Niels Erik Norlund; Niels Nielsen
- Doctoral students: Anders Hald

Georg William Rasch (/ˈræʃ/) (21 September 1901 – 19 October 1980) was a Danish mathematician, statistician, and psychometrician, most famous for the development of a class of measurement models known as Rasch models. He studied with R.A. Fisher and also briefly with Ragnar Frisch, and was elected a member of the International Statistical Institute in 1948.

In 1919, Rasch began studying mathematics at the University of Copenhagen. He completed a master's degree in 1925 and received a doctorate in science with thesis director Niels Erik Nørlund in 1930. Rasch married in 1928. Unable to find work as a mathematician in the 1930s, he turned to work as a statistical consultant. In this capacity, he worked on a range of problems, including problems of biological growth.

== Contributions to psychometrics ==
Georg Rasch is best known for his contributions to psychometrics. His work in this field began when he used the Poisson distribution to model the number of errors made by students when reading texts. He referred to the model as the multiplicative Poisson model.

He later developed the Rasch model for dichotomous data, which he applied to response data derived from intelligence and attainment tests including data collected by the Danish military. At the same epoch, American scientists independently developed item response theory (IRT). Within IRT, the Rasch model is one of the most simple response models. In contrast to other simple models, the Rasch model has a distinctive mathematical property: the model parameters (item difficulties, examinee ability) are sufficient statistics. Rasch demonstrated that his approach met criteria for measurement deduced from an analysis of measurement in the physical sciences. He also proposed generalizations of his model (Rasch, 1960/1980, 1977).

Today, the Rasch model is used extensively in assessment in education and educational psychology, particularly for attainment and cognitive assessments.

== Major publications ==
- Rasch, G. (1960/1980). Probabilistic models for some intelligence and attainment tests. (Copenhagen, Danish Institute for Educational Research), expanded edition (1980) with foreword and afterword by B.D. Wright. Chicago: The University of Chicago Press.
- Rasch, G. (1961). On general laws and the meaning of measurement in psychology, pp. 321–334 in Proceedings of the Fourth Berkeley Symposium on Mathematical Statistics and Probability, IV. Berkeley: University of Chicago Press, 1980.
- Rasch, G. (1977). On Specific Objectivity: An attempt at formalizing the request for generality and validity of scientific statements. The Danish Yearbook of Philosophy, 14, 58-93.

== Obituary ==
- Andersen, E. B. (1982) Georg Rasch (1901–1980), Psychometrika, 47,(4), 375-376.
