= Alina von Davier =

Romanian-American psychometrician

- Born: September 11, 1967 (age 59); Bucharest, Romania
- Education: Otto von Guericke University Magdeburg
- Known for: Computational Psychometrics, Test Equating, Multistage testing
- Scientific career
- Fields: Psychometrics
- Workplaces: Duolingo, University of Oxford, Carnegie Mellon University
- Thesis: Tests of Unconfoundedness in Regression Models with Normally Distributed Variables (Berichte aus der Mathematik) (2001)
- Doctoral advisor: Norbert Gaffke
- Other academic advisors: Rolf Steyer

Alina Anca von Davier (born September 11, 1967) is a psychometrician and researcher in computational psychometrics, machine learning, and education. Von Davier is a researcher, innovator, and an executive leader with over 20 years of experience in EdTech and in the assessment industry. She is the Chief of Assessment at Duolingo, where she leads the Duolingo English Test research and development area. She is also the Founder and CEO of EdAstra Tech, a service-oriented EdTech company. In 2022, she joined the University of Oxford as an Honorary Research Fellow, and Carnegie Mellon University as a Senior Research Fellow.

== Education ==
Von Davier completed a M.S. in Mathematics from the University of Bucharest in 1990. She completed a doctorate in mathematics from Otto von Guericke University Magdeburg in 2000.

== Career ==
As one of the pioneers of the field of computational psychometrics, von Davier has dedicated her career to advancing the field through her work in both academia and industry. She served as Chief Officer at ACT (test) leading ACTNext, an R&D-based innovation division. Prior to this, she worked for 15 years at Educational Testing Service, where her latest position was Senior Center Director. In 2020, she left her position at ACT and joined Duolingo as Chief of Assessment for the Duolingo English Test.

Von Davier has made significant contributions to the field of psychometrics through her work in academic settings. She was the Chair of the Editorial Council of the Psychometric Society, and an associate editor of Psychometrika. She also served as guest editor for both Applied Psychological Measurement and the Journal of Educational Measurement. In 2022 she served as the Chairperson of the global board of directors for the Association of Test Publishers, and was the president of the International Association of Computerized Adaptive Testing from 2019 to 2022.

Von Davier was a member of the Board of Directors for Smart Sparrow, an adaptive learning company from 2018 to 2020. She currently serves as a Director on the Board for MACAT, an education company focused on critical and creative thinking, learning and assessment.

She currently sits on the global board of directors for the Association of Test Publishers and is the president of the International Association of Computerized Adaptive Testing.

== Recognition ==
Von Davier’s work has been recognized in the academic community. In 2019, she was a finalist for the Innovator award from the EdTech Digest. In 2020, she received ATP’s Career Award for her contributions to assessment. The American Educational Research Association awarded her the Division D Signification Contribution Educational Measurement and Research Methodology Award for her publications “Computerized Multistage Testing: Theory and Applications” (2014) and an edited volume on test equating, “Statistical Models for Test Equating, Scaling, and Linking” (2011). In 2022 she received the National Council on Measurement in Education's Bradley Hanson award for her work on adaptive testing and for the co-authored book on computer adaptive testing with R.

== Selected works ==
=== Books and edited volumes ===
- von Davier, A. A., Mislevy, R.J., and Hao, J. (Eds.) (2021). Computational Psychometrics: New Methodologies for a New Generation of Digital Learning and Assessment: With Examples in R and Python (Methodology of Educational Measurement and Assessment). Springer International Publishing.
- von Davier, A.A. (2017). Measurement issues in collaborative learning and assessment. [Special Issue]. Journal of Educational Measurement, 54(1).
- von Davier, A.A., Zhu, M., and Kyllonen, P.C. (2017). Innovative Assessment of Collaboration. Springer International Publishing.
- Yan, D., von Davier, A. A., and Lewis, C. (Eds.) (2014). Computerized multistage testing: Theory and applications. London, UK: Chapman & Hall.
- Mislevy, R. J., Corrigan, S., Oranje, A., Dicerbo, K., John, M., Bauer, M. I., Hoffman, E., von Davier, A. A., and Hao, J. (2014), Psychometrics and game-based assessments. Institute of Play.
- von Davier, A. A. (Ed.) (2011). Statistical models for test equating, scaling and linking. New York, NY: Springer-Verlag.
- von Davier, A. A., and Liu, M. (Eds.) (2008). Population Invariance of Test Equating and Linking: Theory Extension and Applications Across Exams [Special Issue]. Applied Psychological Measurement, 32(1).
- von Davier, A. A., Holland, P. W., and Thayer, D. T. (2004). The kernel method of test equating. New York, NY: Springer Verlag.
- von Davier, A. A. (2001). Testing unconfoundedness in regression models with normally distributed regressors [Dissertation]. Aachen, Germany: Shaker Verlag.
