= Sandip Sinharay =

Indian American Statistician

- Title: Linda Cook Chair in the Science of Measurement
- Awards: Award for Career Contributions to Educational Measurement

Academic background
- Education: Iowa State University; Indian Statistical Institute
- Thesis: Variance Component Testing for Generalized Linear Mixed Models (2001)

Academic work
- Discipline: Statistics; Psychometrics; Education
- Institutions: Educational Testing Service

Sandip Sinharay is an Indian-born statistician and psychometrician specializing in educational measurement. He holds the title of Linda Cook Chair in the Science of Measurement at Educational Testing Service (ETS) and is the Executive Editor of Psychometrika.

== Academic background ==
Sinharay is a statistician who attended the Iowa State University and the Indian Statistical Institute.

== Career ==
Sinharay conducts academic work in the disciplines of statistics, psychometrics, and educational measurement, primarily addressing issues related to the quality of test scores. Over his career, he has held various research positions and editorial roles in journals in the field of educational measurement and psychometrics, including serving as editor of the Journal of Educational Measurement and the Journal of Educational and Behavioral Statistics. In 2025, he was awarded the Award for Career Contributions to Educational Measurement by the National Council on Measurement in Education (NCME). He has also been recognized for his work “promising to make a substantive contribution to the field of educational measurement,” and for research on item response theory model data fit that provides techniques with practical benefits for testing programs.

=== Published works and reception ===
Sinharay is the Editor-in-Chief of the second edition of the Encyclopedia of Measurement in Social Sciences (Elsevier).

Sinharay is a co-author of the book Subscores: A Practical Guide to Their Production and Consumption (Cambridge University Press). The book received an independent review in the Journal of Educational and Behavioral Statistics, where Mark Reckase noted that the book is "a valuable resource for all the target audiences", though he questioned whether creating subscores was comparable to "making a silk purse from a sow’s ear".

In 2007, Sinharay co-edited the Handbook of Statistics, Volume 26: Psychometrics (Elsevier) alongside C. R. Rao. The volume, which covers foundational and modern developments in educational measurement and psychometrics including item response theory, was described by reviewer R. J. de Ayala in the Journal of the American Statistical Association as a significant resource for the field, noting its comprehensive coverage of both theory and practical applications in large-scale testing.

Sinharay's methodological work on test equating and related statistical procedures has been referenced in the educational measurement literature and is discussed in textbooks including Test Equating, Scaling, and Linking: Methods and Practices by Michael Kolen and Robert Brennan.

== Public commentary ==
There was an article in the Bengali newspaper Anandabazar Patrika in 2023 about ragging at Indian engineering colleges. In the article, Sinharay was interviewed about his 1991 ragging incident that led to his leaving the Indian Institute of Technology, Kharagpur, a few days after joining the institute.
