= Hua-Hua Chang =

Chinese psychometrician

Hua-Hua Chang is a Chinese psychometrician.

== Biography ==
After earning a diploma in mathematics at East China Normal University in 1980, Chang moved to the United States to pursue masters and doctoral studies in statistics at the University of Illinois Urbana-Champaign. His 1992 doctoral dissertation, Some Theoretical and Applied Results Concerning Item Response Theory Model Estimation, was advised by William Fleming Stout. Chang then worked as research scientist for the Educational Testing Service between 1992 and 1999. Between 1997 and 1998, he was an associate professor at the Chinese University of Hong Kong. From 1999 to 2001, Chang was affiliated with the National Board of Medical Examiners, then returned to academia, joining the University of Texas at Austin faculty. In 2005, Chang returned to UIUC, as a professor of educational psychology and within the Center for East Asian and Pacific Studies until 2018. That year, Chang was appointed Charles R. Hicks Chair Professor at the Purdue University College of Education, as well as a courtesy professor of statistics.

Chang succeeded Mark L. Davison as chief editor of the academic journal Applied Psychological Measurement. The first issue of Chang's editorial tenure was published in November 2012. From 2012 to 2013, Chang was president of the Psychometric Society.

Chang was elected to fellowship of the American Educational Research Association in 2010, and was awarded the AERA's E. F. Lindquist Award in 2017. The American Statistical Association elected Chang to fellowship in 2019. Chang received the 2021 Award for Career Contributions from the National Council on Measurement in Education.
