= Computer-adaptive sequential testing =

Computer-adaptive sequential testing (CAST) is another term for multistage testing. A CAST test is a type of computer-adaptive test or computerized classification test that uses pre-defined groups of items called testlets rather than operating at the level of individual items. CAST is a term introduced by psychometricians working for the National Board of Medical Examiners. In CAST, the testlets are referred to as panels.
