= Journal of Educational and Behavioral Statistics =

- Discipline: Education, psychology, mathematical methods
- Language: English
- Edited by: Steven Culpepper, Gongjun Xu

Publication details
- Former name: Journal of Educational Statistics
- History: 1976-present
- Publisher: SAGE Publications on behalf of the American Educational Research Association
- Frequency: Bimonthly
- Impact factor: 2.4 (2022)

Standard abbreviations
- ISO 4: J. Educ. Behav. Stat.

Indexing
- ISSN: 1076-9986 (print); 1935-1054 (web)
- LCCN: 94664267
- OCLC no.: 30674665

Links
- Journal homepage; Submission guidelines; Online archive; Journal page at association's website

The Journal of Educational and Behavioral Statistics is a peer-reviewed academic journal published by SAGE Publications on behalf of the American Educational Research Association and American Statistical Association. It covers statistical methods and applied statistics in the educational and behavioral sciences. The journal was established in 1976 as the Journal of Educational Statistics and obtained its current name in 1994. The journal's editors are Steven Andrew Culpepper (University of Illinois at Urbana-Champaign) and Gongjun Xu (University of Michigan).

== Mission statement ==
The Journal of Educational and Behavioral Statistics (JEBS) provides an outlet for papers that are original and useful to those applying statistical approaches to problems and issues in educational or behavioral research. Typical papers will present new methods of analysis. In addition, critical reviews of current practice, tutorial presentations of less well known methods, and novel applications of already-known methods will be published. Papers discussing statistical techniques without specific educational or behavioral interest will have lower priority.

== Abstracting and indexing ==
Journal of Educational and Behavioral Statistics is abstracted and indexed in, among other databases, SCOPUS and the Social Sciences Citation Index. According to the Journal Citation Reports, the journal has a 2022 impact factor of 2.4.

== Editors-in-chief ==
The following is a list of the people who have recently been the editor-in-chief of Journal of Educational and Behavioral Statistics:

- Steven Culpepper
- Li Cai
- Daniel McCaffrey
- Sandip Sinharay
- Matthew Johnson
- David Rindskopf
- David Thissen
- Howard Wainer
