= Howard Wainer =

American statistician

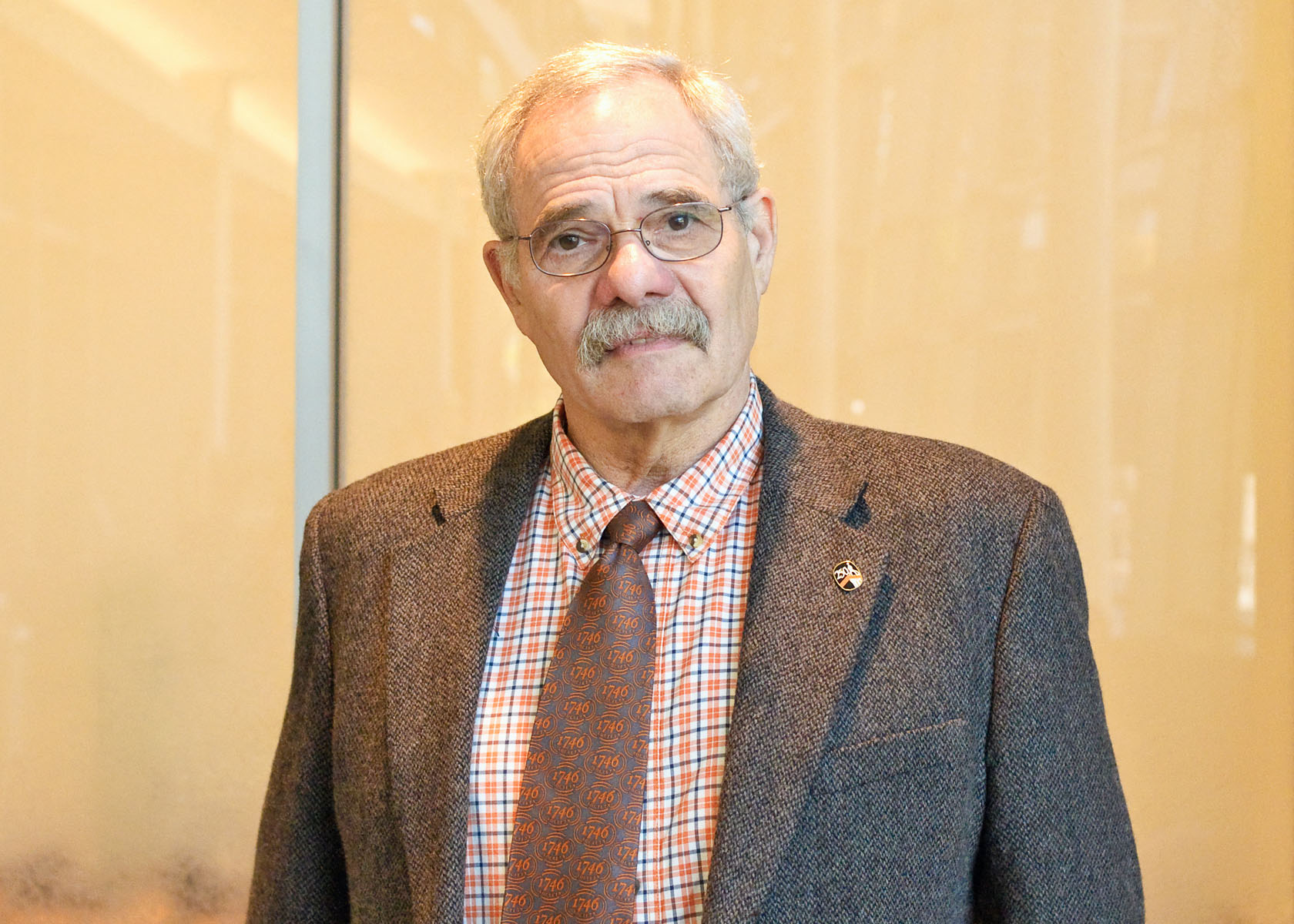
- Born: Howard Charles Goldhaber; October 26, 1943 (age 82); New York City, U.S.
- Education: Princeton University; Rensselaer Polytechnic Institute
- Known for: Unit-weighted regression
- Scientific career
- Fields: Statistics
- Workplaces: University of Pennsylvania; University of Chicago
- Doctoral advisor: Harold Gulliksen
- Doctoral students: David Thissen

Howard Charles Wainer (born October 26, 1943) is an American statistician, past principal research scientist at the Educational Testing Service, adjunct professor of statistics at the Wharton School of the University of Pennsylvania, and author, known for his contributions in the fields of statistics, psychometrics, and statistical graphics.

== Biography ==
=== Early life ===
Howard Wainer was born Howard Charles Goldhaber in Brooklyn, New York on October 26, 1943. In 1948 his father Meyer Goldhaber, an anatomist by education and a dentist by profession, died of complications from a bleeding ulcer at the age of 35. Howard, his brother and his mother moved in with his mother's parents. After two years his mother married Sam Wainer, a local businessman, and the family relocated to Long Island. Howard was formally adopted by his mother's new husband and took the surname Wainer.

=== Education ===
Early on Wainer showed an aptitude for science and mathematics. In 1960, at the end of his junior year in high school, he was accepted into a National Science Foundation honors program at Columbia University. He spent two hours traveling on subway and bus each way to and from Columbia, learning about Markov chains and number theory in the morning and working on the IBM 650 computer in the afternoon.

Wainer's experiences at Columbia motivated him to continue his studies along similar lines. He matriculated at Rensselaer Polytechnic Institute in 1961 to study mathematics. It was at R.P.I. that Wainer first encountered psychometrics. There, Professor George Boguslavsky was so impressed with his abilities and enthusiasm that he recommended Wainer for a Psychometric Fellowship at Princeton University under Harold Gulliksen. Wainer received his B.S. from R.P.I. in mathematics in 1965 and a Ph.D. from Princeton in psychometrics in 1968.

=== Career ===
Howard Wainer began his teaching career at Temple University in 1968, staying on as an assistant professor until 1970. After Temple he taught at the University of Chicago, as a member of the Committee on Methodology in the department of Behavioral Sciences until 1977. Wainer then moved to Washington, D.C., to join the Bureau of Social Science Research, a nonprofit organization that focused on policy research. During his time in DC Wainer also joined with Richard Roistacher and Barbara Noble in founding Multiple Technical Services, a small firm that provided statistical and computational advice to the DC research community. In 1980 he moved to Princeton NJ to become a principal research scientist at the Educational Testing Service, a position he held for 21 years. In 2001 he assumed the position of Distinguished Research Scientist at the National Board of Medical Examiners, from which he retired on December 2, 2016. Wainer was also an adjunct professor of statistics at the Wharton School of the University of Pennsylvania from 2002 until 2013.

=== Awards and honors ===
Howard Wainer is the recipient of numerous awards and honors: He is a fellow of the American Statistical Association and the American Educational Research Association. He was given a Career Achievement Award for Contributions to Educational Measurement by the National Council on Measurement in Education in 2007, the Samuel J. Messick Award for Distinguished Scientific Contributions from Division 5 of the American Psychological Association in 2009, and the Lifetime Achievement Award from the Psychometric Society in 2013. He also received the ACT/AERA E. F. Lindquist Award for Outstanding Research in Testing & Measurement in 2015. His work on testlets was recognized when he received the Award for Scientific Contribution to a Field of Educational Measurement from the National Council on Measurement in Education in 2006. His book Graphic Discovery was named by Choice as the “Best Math book of 2005”. He was a Distinguished Visiting Lecturer at the Hebrew University in Jerusalem, the University of Twente, Enschede, The Netherlands, and the American College Testing organization. He also received the Educational Testing Service’s Senior Scientist Award in 1990.

=== Current status ===
Howard Wainer lives with his wife, Linda Steinberg, in Pennington, New Jersey.

== Work ==
=== Contributions to statistics ===
Since 1974 when he published his first article on statistical graphics, an empirical verification of the efficacy of the suspended Rootogram, Howard Wainer has been an advocate for the efficacy of graphics for communicating quantitative phenomena. He is one of the principals responsible for the renewed importance of graphics in statistics. In addition to the three books he authored on graphical methods: Picturing the Uncertain World, Graphic Discovery and Visual Revelations he was also responsible for the English translation of two of the masterworks in the field by the French semiologist Jacques Bertin.

Wainer’s approach to the study of graphics has always shown a deep respect for the work of those who had preceded him. In 2007 he arranged for the publication of replica volumes of William Playfair's Atlas as well as his Statistical Breviary, the first books on the subject. In them he collaborated with Ian Spence on an extended introduction to Playfair and a biography of him.

Wainer has done extensive work on problems in psychometrics. He has authored, co-authored or edited the principal texts in five of the major areas of the subject: test scoring, test validity, computerized adaptive testing, test fairness, and, most recently, on a theory of testlets.

Wainer has published more than 450 articles, chapters and books. His latest book Truth or Truthiness explains how to use evidence to debunk baseless claims. Since 1990 Wainer has written the popular column “Visual Revelations” for Chance magazine. Wainer edited the Journal of Educational and Behavioral Statistics from 2002 through 2004 as well as being an associate editor of a handful of statistical and psychometric journals. He is currently on the Board of Editors of Significance, the new joint publication of the American Statistical Association and the Royal Statistical Society.

He has also served on the front lines of educational practice by working for many years as a consultant for teachers’ unions, with a five-year hiatus when he served on the Princeton Board of Education. He has also served, in many capacities, as a consultant and advisor to government and industry.

== Selected publications ==
- Wainer, Howard (2016). Truth or Truthiness: Distinguishing Fact from Fiction by Learning to Think like a Data Scientist. Cambridge University Press. ISBN 978-1107130579.
- Wainer, Howard (2011). Uneducated Guesses: Using Evidence to Uncover Misguided Education Policies. Princeton University Press. ISBN 9780691149288.
- — (1993). Paul W. Holland (ed.). Differential Item Functioning. Routledge. ISBN 0805809724.
- — (2000). Visual Revelations: Graphical Tales of Fate and Deception From Napoleon Bonaparte To Ross Perot. Psychology Press. ISBN 0805838783.
- — (2000). Computerized Adaptive Testing: A Primer (2nd ed.). Hillsdale, N. J.: Lawrence Erlbaum Associates. ISBN 0805835113.
- — & Howard Wainer (2012). A Statistical Guide for the Ethically Perplexed. Chapman and Hall. ISBN 978-1439873687.
- — (2013). Medical Illuminations: Using Evidence, Visualization and Statistical Thinking to Improve Healthcare. Oxford University Press. ISBN 978-0199668793.

See References for other publications

== See also ==
- Computerized adaptive testing
- Differential item functioning
- Test validity
