= Jacqueline P. Leighton =

Canadian-Chilean educational psychologist, academic and author

- Born: Santiago, Chile
- Occupations: Educational psychologist, academic and author
- Awards: Significant Contribution to Educational Measurement and Research Methodology, American Educational Research Association (2009); Outstanding International Research Collaboration Award, American Educational Research Association (2017)

Academic background
- Education: University of Alberta
- Thesis: An Alternate Approach to Understanding Formal Reasoning: Thinking According to the Inductive-Coherence Model (1999)

Jacqueline P. Leighton is a Canadian-Chilean educational psychologist, academic and author. She is a full professor in the Faculty of Education as well as vice-dean of Faculty Development and Faculty Affairs at the University of Alberta.

Leighton is most known for her works on human development and cognition, primarily focusing on cognitive diagnostic testing, children's rights and assessment of learning environments and learning interventions. She pioneered the Learning Errors And Formative Feedback (LEAFF) model, focused on comprehension of learning error mechanisms, their quantification, and the use of formative feedback to enhance student learning outcomes. Among her authored works are her publications in academic journals, including Journal of Educational Measurement and Educational Measurement: Issues and Practice as well as books such as The Learning Sciences in Educational Assessment: The Role of Cognitive Models and Leveraging Socio-Emotional Assessment to Foster Children's Human Rights. Moreover, she has been acknowledged by the American Educational Research Association (AERA) Division D in 2009 for her contributions to educational measurement and research methodology, and the Canadian Council of Learning as a Minerva Scholar, and is the recipient of the 2017 Outstanding International Research Collaboration Award from American Educational Research Association.

== Early life and education ==
Leighton earned her B.A. (Honours) in Psychology in 1993, followed by an MEd in Educational Psychology in 1995 from the University of Alberta. She then pursued a PhD in Psychology from the same institution, which she completed in 1999.

== Career ==
Leighton commenced her academic journey in 1992 at the University of Alberta. During this period, she fulfilled various roles including teaching assistant, research assistant, and project coordinator until 1999. From 2000 to 2001, Leighton undertook the role of a visiting research scholar in the Department of Human Development at the University of Maryland. Subsequently, from 2001 to 2005, she held positions as an assistant professor followed by an appointment as an associate professor at the University of Alberta from 2005 to 2008. Since 2008, she has held the position of professor in the Department of Educational Psychology at the University of Alberta. The Department of Educational Psychology ceased to exist in 2022 when the Faculty of Education underwent significant restructuring, leading to a non-departmentalized faculty.

In 2009, she was appointed as the Director of the Centre for Research in Applied Measurement and Evaluation at the University of Alberta. Following this, she served as the chair in the Department of Educational Psychology at the University of Alberta from 2011 to 2016. Between 2010 and 2013, Leighton held an appointment as the editor-in-chief of the journal Educational Measurement: Issues and Practice. Since 2023, she has been serving as the vice-dean of Faculty Development and Faculty Affairs in the Faculty of Education at the University of Alberta.

== Works ==
Leighton has authored various books throughout her academic career. In 2007, she edited the book titled Cognitive Diagnostic Assessment for Education: Theory and Applications. The book explored Cognitive Diagnostic Assessment (CDA) in education, covering its conceptual basis, methods, applications, and unresolved issues, providing an examination of its role in educational reform and assessment. In his review of the book, Robert J. Sternberg, a professor of Human Development at Cornell University stated "Today, more effort is being expended on educational assessment than at any time in the past. But often this assessment is done without full, or sometimes, any serious regard to the many advancements in psychological and educational research that could enhance the quality of this assessment. This book will be invaluable to those who wish to learn about these advances and how to apply them in assessment, including high-stakes testing." She and her co-editor Mark J. Gierl were presented in 2009 with the AERA's Division D award for Significant Contribution to Educational Measurement and Research Methodology. In 2011, she co-authored a book with Mark J. Gierl titled The Learning Sciences in Educational Assessment: The Role of Cognitive Models, wherein she explored the role of cognitive models in education, and advocated for the development of psychologically informative and psychometrically viable large-scale assessments to drive positive changes in educational outcomes amidst national policy initiatives like No Child Left Behind. DD Sandilands, in their review of the book, praised the authors for their effective use of illustrative examples and insightful guiding questions, which help elucidate the proposed characteristics of cognitive models.

Leighton's 2017 publication Using Think-Aloud Interviews and Cognitive Labs in Educational Research provided a guide to think-aloud interviews and cognitive laboratory interviews. The book was reviewed by Melanie Kinskey from Sam Houston State University, who remarked, "Overall, Leighton organizes her book in a spiraling method. She takes the time to revisit and reinforce information from previous chapters before expanding upon it in the current chapter. She effectively acknowledges key concepts from earlier chapters and prompts readers to revisit them if necessary." Most recently in 2023, she authored Leveraging Socio-Emotional Assessment to Foster Children's Human Rights. The book emphasized integrating socio-emotional assessment into education to foster children's human rights.

== Research ==
Leighton's interdisciplinary research has focused on human development, cognition, critical thinking, research methodology, and educational measurement of learning. In 1997 she addressed the computational and visualization challenges in ANCOVA with three covariates by proposing a specialized GLM design and using Mathematica for symbolic computation and four-dimensional contour plotting to identify regions of significance and orthogonal contrasts. Her PhD thesis focused on the Wason Selection task, a classic task to measure logical reasoning, and how its traditional abstract presentation often misrepresented the reasoning capacities of human participants. Her collaborative work with MJ Gierl and others explored K. Tatsuoka's rule-space model, elucidating its application in educational assessment for categorizing examinees' responses into cognitive skill patterns and examining its implications, controversies, and unresolved issues. In related research, she and Gierl introduced the Attribute Hierarchy Method (AHM), a cognitive item response theory model, demonstrating its application in bridging cognitive theory and psychometric practice for the development and analysis of educational and psychological tests, particularly showcasing its differences from Tatsuoka's rule-space approach and its use in evaluating cognitive competencies in syllogistic reasoning tasks.

Examining the intersection of cognitive psychology and educational measurement, Leighton's research focused on the value of verbal reports in elucidating cognitive models for test performance, addressing concerns regarding their trustworthiness, and proposing avenues for enhancing their utility in educational assessment. Her 2007 research explored the role and significance of different cognitive models underlying educational tests, advocating for their explicit identification in test development to improve diagnostic inferences about examinees' thinking processes. In 2010, she investigated secondary teachers' beliefs regarding the effectiveness of classroom tests versus large-scale tests in providing information about student learning processes, influencing meaningful learning, and eliciting learning or test-taking strategies. The study found that teachers generally perceive classroom tests as more informative, influential, and conducive to genuine learning. Her 2016 collaborative research with VJ Shute and others explored the evolution and future prospects of assessment practices in education, focusing on the influence of instructional technology and learning science theory. The study also advocated for comprehensive assessment systems that measure the entire student learning experience. In 2022, she conducted a systematic review of data literacy assessments across various educational levels and audiences, with the goal of evaluating definitions, competencies, assessment types, and reliability, ultimately concluding the necessity for high-quality assessment tools to support teaching and learning in this emerging domain.

== Awards and honors ==
- 2009 – Significant Contribution to Educational Measurement and Research Methodology Award, American Educational Research Association
- 2017 – Outstanding International Research Collaboration Award, American Educational Research Association

== Bibliography ==
=== Books ===
- The Learning Sciences in Educational Assessment: The Role of Cognitive Models (2011) ISBN 9780511996276
- Using Think-Aloud Interviews and Cognitive Labs in Educational Research (2017) ISBN 9780199372904
- Leveraging Socio-Emotional Assessment to Foster Children’s Human Rights (2023) ISBN 9780367715984

=== Selected articles ===
- Gierl, M. J., Leighton, J. P., & Hunka, S. M. (2000). An NCME instructional module on exploring the logic of Tatsuoka's Rule‐Space Model for test development and analysis. Educational Measurement: Issues and Practice, 19(3), 34–44.
- Leighton, J. P., Gierl, M. J., & Hunka, S. M. (2004). The attribute hierarchy method for cognitive assessment: A variation on Tatsuoka's rule‐space approach. Journal of educational measurement, 41(3), 205–237.
- Leighton, J. P. (2004). Avoiding misconception, misuse, and missed opportunities: The collection of verbal reports in educational achievement testing. Educational Measurement: Issues and Practice, 23(4), 6–15.
- Leighton, J. P., & Gierl, M. J. (2007). Defining and evaluating models of cognition used in educational measurement to make inferences about examinees' thinking processes. Educational Measurement: Issues and Practice, 26(2), 3–16.
- Shute, V. J., Leighton, J. P., Jang, E. E., & Chu, M. W. (2016). Advances in the science of assessment. Educational Assessment, 21(1), 34–59.
