= Fumiko Samejima =

Japanese psychometrician (born 1930)

- Born: December 25th, 1930; Tokyo, Japan
- Died: Circa 2021
- Citizenship: Japanese
- Occupations: Professor Emeritus at University of Tennessee, Psychology Department

Academic background
- Education: Keio University
- Doctoral advisor: Tarow Indow

Academic work
- Discipline: PhD in Psychology
- Sub-discipline: Psychometrics

Fumiko Samejima (1930–c2021) was a prominent Japanese-born psychometrician best known for her development of the Graded Response Model (GRM), a fundamental approach in Item Response Theory (IRT). Her innovative methods became influential in psychological and educational measurement, particularly in improving the accuracy of tests involving Likert-scale questions and other graded responses. She published her seminal paper “Estimation of Latent Ability Using a Response Pattern of Graded Scores” in 1969. This publication became a foundational reference in psychometric literature, significantly advancing the analysis of ordered categorical data.

Fumiko served as President of the Psychometric Society (1996-1997). She also received various awards during her life including Outstanding Technical Contribution from the National Council on Measurement in Education (1991).

== Biography ==
Fumiko Samejima was born on December 25, 1930, in Tokyo, Japan. She developed a strong interest in mathematics while at Jo-koshi Fuzoku High School. After a year of studying math in college, she transferred to Keio University. There, a research study on twins and the ongoing nature versus nurture debate piqued her interest, prompting her to switch her major to psychology and apply for graduate school.

Samejima felt disillusioned with psychology, as it did not seem scientific enough to her. This changed after she read Frederic Lord's 1952 monograph on psychometrics, which was her first exposure to latent trait theory. This theory posits that individuals can be evaluated through test items designed to measure underlying traits, such as intelligence. Her renewed enthusiasm for mathematics rekindled her interest in psychometrics, leading her to study under Tarow Indow, a prominent cognitive scientist. Together, they co-wrote a book on non-verbal reasoning, "On the Results Obtained by the Absolute Scaling Model and the Lord Model in the Field of the Intelligence". Samejima earned her Ph.D. in psychology from Keio University in 1965.

After graduating, Samejima took a trip to the United States where she met Frederic M. Lord, Melvin R. Novick, and Norman Fredrickson from the Educational Testing Service (ETS). Soon after she returned to Japan, Norman Frederickson invited her to join ETS where she spent a year there as a visiting research psychologist. After ETS, Samejima accepted an invitation to be a research fellow at the L.L. Thurstone Psychometric Laboratory at the University of North Carolina at Chapel Hill for a year.

Due to visa issues, Samejima decided to move to Canada and take a teaching job at the University of New Brunswick, where she taught test theory and statistics for two years and published her most famous work, a monograph in Psychometrika titled “Estimation of Latent Ability Using a Response Pattern of Graded Scores” in 1969. This work was described as "a genuine breakthrough in test theory" by R. Darrell Bock. Samejima then took a job at Bowling Green State University in 1970, while there she published another significant paper, “A General Model for Free Response Data”. She then accepted a full professor position at the University of Tennessee Knoxville in 1973. She retired in May 2006 and subsequently moved to Japan, where she died circa 2021.

Samejima’s research at the University of Tennessee Knoxville covered a wide range of topics and has garnered her a number of awards. She also produced 35 technical reports for the Office of Naval Research, who funded a portion of her research from 1977 to 1992. The Law School Admission Council has also used Samejima’s research, and funded her from 1999 to 2001.

== Research ==
Samejima’s most famous work is her monograph, "Estimation of Latent Ability Using a Response Pattern of Graded Scores" (1969), in which she introduced the Graded Response Model (GRM). The GRM developed by Samejima is her main contribution to psychometrics and educational measurement. GRM is an extension of Item Response Theory (IRT) that is particularly effective for handling ordered response categories, such as those used in Likert scales. This model helps measure individuals' abilities or traits based on their responses to questionnaires that contain items with multiple response options. By capturing the nuanced ways in which individuals at different levels of a latent trait are likely to endorse particular response categories. Samejima’s GRM allowed for more accurate and informative measurements in both educational and psychological contexts. Her work on GRM is still widely applied in educational testing, personality assessment, and survey analysis, and it continues to contribute substantially to how researchers understand the relationship between test items and latent traits.

Beyond this seminal contribution, Samejima authored numerous influential articles in academic journals, focusing on the extension of Item Response Theory, differential item functioning, and test information functions. Her rigorous, mathematically detailed publications remain core readings in the field of psychometric analysis.

== Service ==
- Editorial Board, Applied Psychological Measurement
- Reviewer, Mathematical Reviews
- Editorial Board, Journal of Educational Statistics (1978-1981)
- Board of Trustees, Psychometric Society (1989-1990)
- Editorial Board, Behaviormetrika (1994-1997)
- Selection Committee for Outstanding Dissertation Awards, National Council on Measurement in Education

== Awards ==
- Outstanding Researcher Award from Behaviormetric Society in Japan (2007)
- Outstanding Technical Contribution to the Field of Educational Measurement from the National Council on Measurement in Education (1991)

== Representative publications ==
- Samejima, F. (1969). Estimation of latent ability using a response pattern of graded scores. Psychometrika Monograph Supplement, 17(4), 1-68.
- Samejima, F. (1972). A general model for free-response data. Psychometrika Monograph Supplement, 37(1, Pt. 2), 68.
- Samejima, F. (1974). Normal ogive model on the continuous response level in the multidimensional latent space. Psychometrika, 39(1), 111-121.
- Samejima F. (1979). A new family of models for the multiple choice item (Research Rep. No. 79-4). Knoxville, TN: University of Tennessee.
- Samejima, F. (1995). Acceleration model in the heterogeneous case of the general graded response model. Psychometrika, 60(4), 549–572.

== Books and Book Chapters ==
- Indow, T., & Samejima, F. (1966). On the Results Obtained by the Absolute Scaling Model and the Lord Model in the Field of the Intelligence. Psychological laboratory on the Hiyoshi campus, Keio University.
- Samejima, F. (1997). Graded Response Model. In: van der Linden, W.J., Hambleton, R.K. (eds) Handbook of Modern Item Response Theory. Springer, New York, NY. https://doi.org/10.1007/978-1-4757-2691-6_5
- Samejima, F. (2011). The general graded response model. In: M. L. Nering & R. Ostini (Eds.), Handbook of polytomous item response theory models (pp. 87–118). Routledge.
- Sammejima, F. (2016). Graded response models. In: van der Linden, W.J. (Ed.). (2016). Handbook of Item Response Theory: Volume 1: Models (1st ed.). Chapman and Hall/CRC. https://doi.org/10.1201/9781315374512
