= Fumiko =

- Pronunciation: Fumiko
- Gender: Female

Origin
- Origin: Japanese
- Region of origin: Japanese

Fumiko (ふみこ) is a feminine Japanese given name.

== Written forms ==
Versions in kanji include:

- 文子 (sentence, child) - also can be read as "Ayako"
- 富美子 or 冨美子 (wealthy beautiful child)
- 芙美子 (hibiscus, beautiful child)
- 史子 (historical child)

== People with the name ==
- Fumiko Aoki (青木 富美子; born 1966), Japanese cross country skier
- Fumiko Chikuma (知久馬 二三子; born 1937), Japanese Social Democratic Party (SDP) politician
- Fumiko Enchi (円地 文子; 1905–1986), Japanese writer and playwright
- Fumiko Furuhashi (born 1959), Japanese former professional tennis player
- Fumiko Futamura, Japanese-American mathematician
- Fumiko Hayashi (author) (林 芙美子; 1903 or 1904 – 1951), Japanese writer and poet
- Fumiko Hayashi (politician) (林 文子; born 1946), Japanese politician
- Fumiko Hayashida (林田 文子; 1911–2014), American activist
- Fumiko Hori (堀 文子; 1918–2019), Japanese artist
- Fumiko Ikawa-Smith (井川スミス史子; born 1930), Japanese Canadian archaeologist
- Fumiko Ishioka (石岡 史子; born 1970), Japanese educator, translator
- Fumiko Ito (伊藤 文子; born 1940), Japanese long jumper
- Fumiko Kaneko (金子 文子; 1903–1926), Japanese anarchist and nihilist
- Fumiko Kita (喜多 文子; 1875–1950), Japanese professional 8-dan go player
- Fumiko Kometani (米谷 ふみ子; born 1930), Japanese author and artist (painter)
- Fumiko Kono (狐野 扶実子; born 1969), Japanese personal and business chef
- Fumiko Minami, (1913/4 – 1959) Japanese housewife who contributed to the invention of the electric rice cooker
- Fumiko Nakajō (中城 ふみ子; 1922–1954), Japanese tanka poet
- Fumiko Nakamura (中村 文子; 1913–2013), Japanese teacher and peace activist
- Fumiko Nakashima (中島 布美子; born 1981), Japanese artist
- Fumiko Okuno (奥野 史子; born 1972), Japanese synchronized swimmer
- Fumiko Orikasa (折笠 富美子; born 1974), Japanese actress, voice actress, and singer
- Fumiko Saiga (齋賀 富美子; 1943–2009), Japanese diplomat
- Fumiko Sakaguchi (坂口 文子; born 1934), Japanese swimmer
- Fumiko Samejima, (1930–2021) Japanese psychometrician
- Fumiko Shinpo (新保 富美子), Japanese former international table tennis player
- Fumiko Shiraga (白神 典子; 1967–2017), Japanese-German classical pianist
- Fumiko Takano (高野 文子; born 1957), Japanese manga artist
- Fumiko Uchimura (内村 史子; born 1957), Japanese voice actress
- Fumiko Yamaguchi, (1903–1987) Japaneseì physician and advocate for reproductive health
- Fumiko Yonekawa (米川 文子; 1894–1995), Japanese koto and shamisen musician
- Fumiko Yoneyama (米山 文子; 1902–1998), Japanese politician
- Fumiko Yonezawa (米沢 富美子; 1938–2019), physicist
