= Anchor test =

In psychometrics, an anchor test is a common set of test items administered in combination with two or more alternative forms of the test with the aim of establishing the equivalence of the test scores on the alternative forms. The purpose of the anchor test is to provide a baseline for an equating analysis between different forms of a test.

Anchor test is one type of psychological assessment tool to measure an individual's knowledge or cognitive ability by testing the same areas in different ways. In psychometrics, to develop assessment tools that are reliable for testing certain skills and abilities are what most Psychometricists are interested in. Anchor tests are not intended to test the subject's ability to take tests, interpret questions, or understand a concept that is unrelated to the test questions. Instead, it eliminates the incongruency between what the test is designed to assess and what it actually assesses. Subjects will be tested on the same knowledge and skills in multiple ways in an anchor test.

Compared with traditional tests in both education and psychology, anchor tests are intended to find out what an individual is able to do rather than what an individual is unable to do. A study examined that higher anchor test to total test correlation leads to better equating . It thus implies that an anchor test with items of medium difficulty (miditest) may lead to better equating than an Anchor test of lesser difficulty (minitest).
