= William Playfair =

British polymath (1759–1823)

- Born: September 22, 1759; Liff, Angus, Scotland
- Died: 11 February 1823 (aged 63); London, England
- Known for: inventor of statistical graphs, writer on political economy, various reported clandestine activities during the French Revolution
- Family: John Playfair (brother); James Playfair (brother); William Henry Playfair (nephew)

William Playfair (22 September 1759 – 11 February 1823) was a Scottish engineer and political economist. The founder of graphical methods of statistics, Playfair invented several types of diagrams: in 1786 he introduced the line, area and bar chart of economic data, and in 1801 he published what were likely the first pie chart and circle graph, used to show part-whole relations. Playfair has been reported to have been a secret agent for the British Government, although this has sometimes been a subject of controversy.

== Biography ==
William Playfair was born in 1759 in Scotland. He was the fourth son, named after his grandfather, of the Reverend James Playfair of the parish of Liff & Benvie near the city of Dundee in Scotland. His notable brothers were architect James Playfair and mathematician John Playfair. His father died in 1772 when he was 13, leaving the eldest brother John to care for the family and his education. After his apprenticeship with Andrew Meikle, the inventor of the threshing machine, Playfair became an engine erector, draftsman and personal assistant to James Watt at the Boulton and Watt steam engine manufactory in Soho, Birmingham.

Playfair had a variety of careers. He was, in turn, a millwright, engineer, draftsman, accountant, inventor, silversmith, merchant, investment broker, economist, statistician, pamphleteer, translator, publicist, land speculator, banker, ardent royalist, de facto intelligence officer, convict, editor, blackmailer and journalist. On leaving Watt's company in 1782, he set up a silversmithing business and shop in London, which failed. In 1787 he moved to Paris, being present for the storming of the Bastille two years later. During the French Revolution, as many Frenchmen were seeking safety and opportunity, Playfair played a role in the Scioto Land sale to French settlers in the Ohio River Valley.

In 1793, after earning the ire of Republican leaders, he escaped to London. In 1797 he opened "The Original Security Bank" with partners John Casper Hartsinck and Julius Hutchinson to provide small-denomination currency. The bank failed, and he thereafter worked as a writer and pamphleteer, and also did some engineering work.

After returning to England, Playfair secretly provided support to the British government throughout the French Revolutionary and Napoleonic Wars—specifically, Secretary of State for War Henry Dundas, Secretary at War William Windham, and Permanent Undersecretary of State Evan Nepean (the de facto chief of civilian intelligence)--pre-dating the formal establishment of the modern British intelligence establishment that emerged in the 1900s. Playfair provided information on events in France and proposed various propaganda and clandestine operations aimed at undermining the French government.

After the failure of the Original Security Bank, Playfair was imprisoned for debt in the Fleet Prison, being released in 1802.

== Work ==
Ian Spence and Howard Wainer in 2001 describe Playfair as "engineer, political economist and scoundrel" while "Eminent Scotsmen" calls him an "ingenious mechanic and miscellaneous writer". It compares his career with the glorious one of his older brother John Playfair, the distinguished Edinburgh mathematics professor, and draws a moral about the importance of "steadiness and consistency of plan" as well as of "genius". Bruce Berkowitz in 2018 provides a detailed portrait of Playfair as an "ambitious, audacious, and woefully imperfect British patriot" who undertook the "most complex covert operation anyone had ever conceived".

=== Statistical graphics ===
Playfair, who argued that charts communicated better than tables of data, has been credited with inventing the line, bar, area, and pie charts. His time-series plots are still presented as models of clarity.

Playfair first published The Commercial and Political Atlas in London in 1786. It contained 43 time-series plots and one bar chart, a form apparently introduced in this work. It has been described by Ian Spence and Howard Wainer as the first major work to contain statistical graphs.

==== Line charts ====
In 1786 Playfair published what is thought to be the earliest statistical graphic—that is, a visual representation of the relationship of two or more variables)--in his Commercial and Political Atlas when he depicted in a line chart the balance of trade between England and other nations, using customs data.

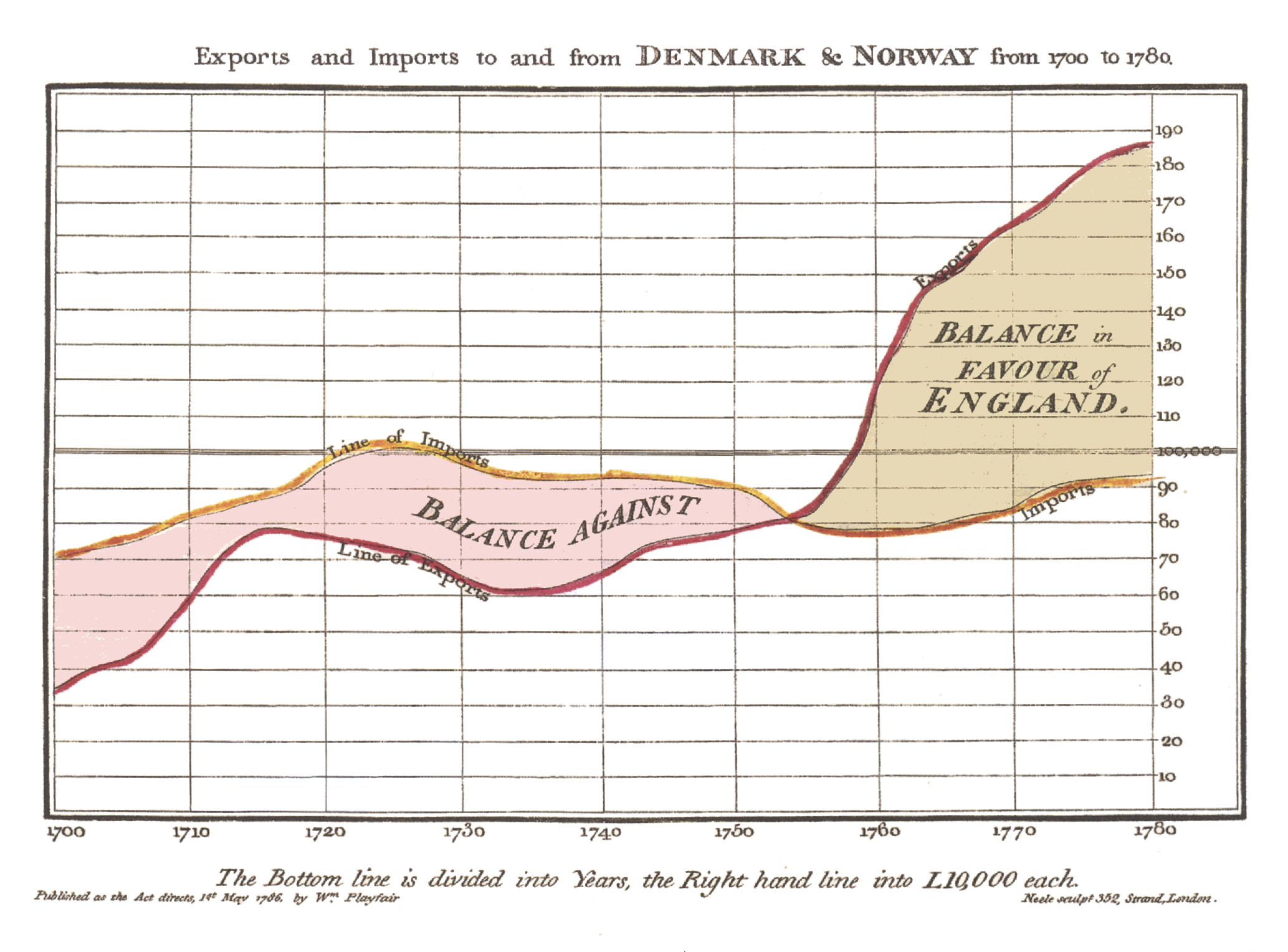
Playfair's trade-balance time-series chart, published in Commercial and Political Atlas, 1786

==== Bar charts ====
Two decades before Playfair published the Atlas, in 1765 Joseph Priestley had created the innovation of the first timeline charts, in which individual bars were used to visualise the life span of a person, and the whole can be used to compare the life spans of multiple persons. According to James R. Beniger and Dorothy L. Robyn, "Priestley's timelines proved a commercial success and a popular sensation, and went through dozens of editions".

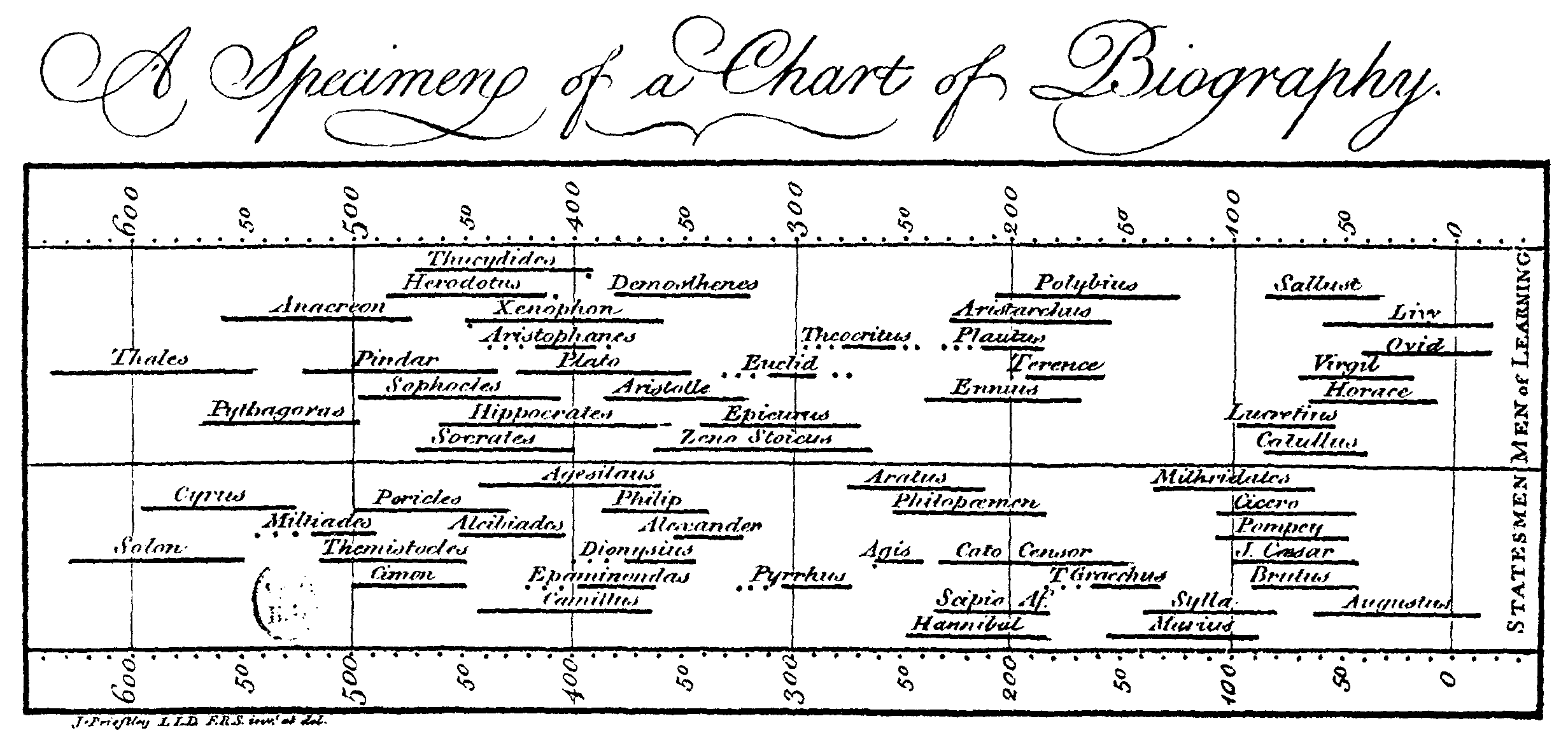

These timelines likely inspired Playfair's invention of the bar chart, which first appeared in his Commercial and Political Atlas, published in 1786. According to Beniger and Robyn, Playfair was driven to this invention by a lack of data. In his Atlas he had collected a series of 34 plates about the import and export from different countries over the years, which he presented as line graphs or surface charts: line graphs shaded or tinted between abscissa and function. Because Playfair lacked the necessary series data for Scotland, he graphed its trade data for a single year as a series of 34 bars, one for each of 17 trading partners.

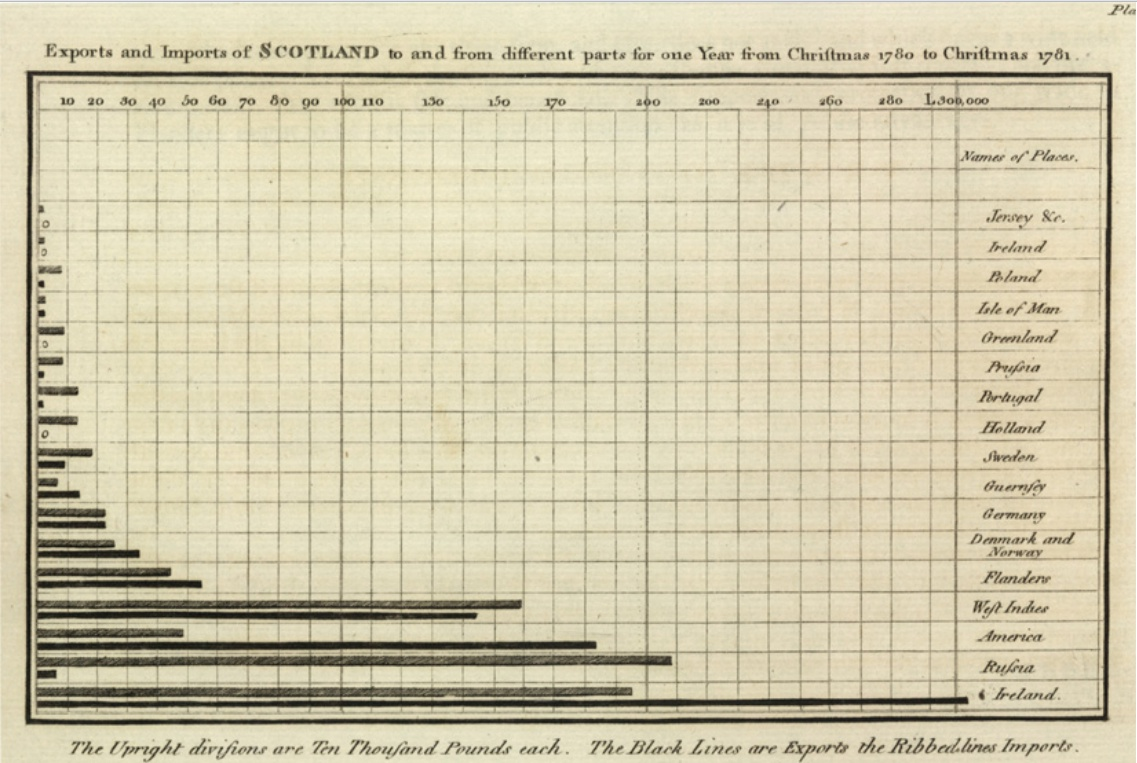

In Playfair's bar chart Scotland's imports and exports from and to 17 countries in 1781 are represented. "This bar chart was the first quantitative graphical form that did not locate data either in space, as had coordinates and tables, or time, as had Priestley's timelines. It constitutes a pure solution to the problem of discrete quantitative comparison".

The idea of representing data as a series of bars had earlier (14th century) been published by Jacobus de Sancto Martino and attributed to Nicole Oresme. Oresme used the bars to generate a graph of velocity against continuously varying time. Playfair's use of bars was to generate a chart of discrete measurements.

==== Pie charts ====
Playfair introduced the pie chart as a means to show proportion in The Statistical Breviary. At the time Playfair sought a means to represent the relative numbers of European, African, and Asian peoples within the Ottoman Empire. Playfair also used a pie chart in a graphic he provided for D. Donnant's Statistical Account of the United States of America to show the relative distribution of land among the states.

Pie chart from Playfair's Statistical Breviary (1801), showing the proportions of the Turkish Empire located in Asia, Europe and Africa before 1789

=== Tables of national statistics ===
Playfair's 1801 The Statistical Breviary was likely the first nation-by-nation compilation of national statistics on area, population, and military capabilities. Its users included Thomas Jefferson, a proponent of a national system of statistics, and Alexander von Humboldt, often cited as a pioneer of modern geography. The Breviary anticipated modern publications such as the Statesman's Yearbook and the CIA's World FactBook.

=== Other works ===
From 1809 until 1811, Playfair published the massive British Family Antiquity, Illustrative of the Origin and Progress of the Rank, Honours and Personal Merit of the Nobility of the United Kingdom. Accompanied with an Elegant Set of Chronological Charts. The work was nine large volumes in eleven parts; Volume Six contained a suite of twelve plates of which ten are in two states, coloured and uncoloured, and 9 large folding tables, partly hand coloured.

This was an important work on genealogy published in a very limited edition. In it, Playfair sought to show the true character and heroism of the British nobility and that the Monarchy, particularly the British Monarchy, is the true defender of liberty. The volumes are separated into the peerage and baronetage of England, Scotland and Ireland.

=== Clandestine activities ===
In 1793, during the War of the First Coalition, Playfair devised a plan for a covert operation that he most probably presented to Henry Dundas, who was home secretary and soon to become Britain's secretary of state for war. Playfair proposed to "fabricate one hundred millions of assignats (the French currency) and spread them in France by every means in my power."

Playfair saw the counterfeiting plan as the lesser of two evils: "That there are two ways of combatting the French nation the forces of which are measured by men and money. Their assignats are their money and it is better to destroy this paper founded upon an iniquitous extortion and a villainous deception than to shed the blood of men." He arranged for the production of paper for the assignats at Haughton Castle in Northumberland and other sites, and distributed them according to an elaborate plan. The plan apparently worked: by 1795 the French assignat had become worthless and the ensuing chaos undermined the French government. Some contemporary accounts even at the time linked Playfair to the clandestine activity. Though Playfair never told anyone about the operation, he alluded to it in a private letter to former foreign secretary and prime minister William Wyndham Grenville in 1811.

The counterfeiting effort was part of a pattern of activities that Playfair undertook that would today be considered intelligence operations. Playfair also provided a model of France's semaphore telegraph system in 1794 to the staff of the Duke of York, then commander of British forces in Flanders and offered a Dutch-crewed ship to assist in quashing the foreign-inspired Nore mutiny against the Royal Navy in 1797.

At the time Britain had not yet established a formal intelligence organization. According to the historian of the Secret Intelligence Service, Christopher Andrew, this did not occur until the early Twentieth Century. Rather, British diplomats, senior officials, and military commanders (like those in other countries) obtained information using their own budgets and personal relationships.

According to historian Jennifer Mori, Playfair began receiving funding from Windham as early as 1793. While in France, Playfair, according to his memoirs, worked with the British ambassador, George Leveson-Gower, 1st Duke of Sutherland, to facilitate the escape of British nationals as the coup that displaced Louis XVI was mounting. It may be notable that, when arriving in France, Playfair became a close friend and business partner of Jean, Baron de Batz, who maintained a clandestine network supporting the Royalists.

While historians, economists, and scholars of the intelligence profession have acknowledged Playfair as a pioneer of intelligence, at least one statistician has contested whether he was a secret agent.

=== Playfair cycle ===
The following quotation, known as the "Playfair cycle," has achieved notoriety as it pertains to the "Tytler cycle":

:...wealth and power have never been long permanent in any place.

...they travel over the face of the earth,
something like a caravan of merchants.
On their arrival, every thing is found green and fresh;
while they remain all is bustle and abundance,
and, when gone, all is left trampled down, barren, and bare.

== Publications ==
- 1785. Increase of Manufactures, Commerce, and Finance, with the Extension of Civil Liberty, Proposed in Regulations for the Interest of Money. London: G.J. & J. Robinson.
- 1786. The Commercial and Political Atlas: Representing, by Means of Stained Copper-Plate Charts, the Progress of the Commerce, Revenues, Expenditure and Debts of England during the Whole of the Eighteenth Century London: J. Wallis.
- 1787. Joseph and Benjamin, a Conversation Translated from a French Manuscript. London: J. Murray.
- 1793. Thoughts on the Present State of French Politics, and the Necessity and Policy of Diminishing France, for Her Internal Peace, and to Secure the Tranquillity of Europe. London: J. Stockdale.
- 1793. A general view of the actual force and resources of France, in January, M. DCC. XCIII: to which is added, a table, shewing the depreciation of assignats, arising from their increase in quantity. London: J. Stockdale.
- 1796. History of Jacobinism, Its Crimes, Cruelties and Perfidies: Comprising an Inquiry into the Manner of Disseminating, under the Appearance of Philosophy and Virtue, Principles which are Equally Subversive of Order, Virtue, Religion, Liberty and Happiness. Vol. I.. Philadelphia: W. Cobbett.
- 1796. For the Use of the Enemies of England, a Real Statement of the Finances and Resources of Great Britain London: J. Stockdale.
- 1798. Lineal arithmetic, Applied to Shew the Progress of the Commerce and Revenue of England During the Present Century. London: A. Paris.
- 1799. Strictures on the Asiatic Establishments of Great Britain, With a View to an Enquiry into the True Interests of the East India Company on the Asiatic Establishments of Great Britain, With a View to an Enquiry into the True Interests of the East India Company. London: Bunney & Gold.
- 1801. Statistical Breviary; Shewing, on a Principle Entirely New, the Resources of Every State and Kingdom in Europe. London: Wallis.
- 1805. An Inquiry into the Permanent Causes of the Decline and Fall of Powerful and Wealthy Nations. London: Greenland & Norris.
- 1805. European commerce, shewing new and secure channels of trade with the continent of Europe... London: W.J. and J. Richardson.
- 1805. Statistical Account of the United States of America by D. F. Donnant . London: J. Whiting. William Playfair, Trans.
- 1807. European Commerce, Shewing New and Secure Channels of Trade with the Continent of Europe. Vol. I.. Philadelphia: J. Humphreys.
- 1808. Inevitable Consequences of a Reform in Parliament
- 1809. A Fair and Candid Address to the Nobility and Baronets of the United Kingdom; Accompanied with Illustrations and Proofs of the Advantage of Hereditary Rank and Title in a Free Country London: Proprietors of Family Antiquity
- 1811. British Family Antiquity: Index to the 9 Volumes of William Playfair's Family Antiquity of the British Nobility
- 1813. Political Portraits in this New Æra, Vol I London: C. Chapple
- 1813. Outlines of a Plan for a New and Solid Balance of Power in Europe. J. Stockdale.
- 1814. Political Portraits in This New Æra, Vol. II . London: C. Chapple.
- 1816. Supplementary Volume to Political Portraits, in This New Æra. London: C. Chapple.
- 1818. The History of England, from the Revolution in 1688 to the Death of George II. Vol. II. R. Scholey.
- 1819. France as it Is, Not Lady Morgan's France, Vol. I. London: C. Chapple.
- 1820. France as it Is, Not Lady Morgan's France, Vol. II. London: C. Chapple.
