= David Thissen =

American quantitative psychologist

- Born: c. 1950 (age 75–76); Fort Dodge, Iowa
- Education: Saint Louis University; University of Chicago
- Known for: Item response theory Unit-weighted regression Test Scoring
- Awards: American Statistical Association Fellow (2006); AERA Inaugural Fellow (2008); NCME Career Contribution Award (2015)
- Scientific career
- Fields: Psychometrics
- Workplaces: University of Kansas; University of North Carolina at Chapel Hill
- Doctoral advisor: R. Darrell Bock
- Doctoral students: Bryce Reeve; Li Cai

David Michael Thissen (born c. 1950) is an emeritus professor of quantitative psychology at the University of North Carolina and former President of the Psychometric Society. He is a fellow at the American Statistical Association and the American Psychological Society.

== Early life and education ==
The eldest of five children, Thissen graduated from St. Edmond High School in Fort Dodge, Iowa and was a national semifinalist in the 1967 Westinghouse Science Talent Search. He earned a bachelor's degree from Saint Louis University and a PhD in quantitative psychology from the University of Chicago, where he was awarded an NSF Graduate Research Fellowship.

== Career ==
Upon receiving his PhD in 1976, Thissen joined the psychology faculty at the University of Kansas and was appointed an associate professor (with tenure) five years later. He moved to the University of North Carolina at Chapel Hill in 1990 as a full professor of psychology and served as the chair of the L. L. Thurstone Psychometric Laboratory until 2002. He continues to work at UNC as a full professor in the Department of Psychology and Neuroscience. He published Test Scoring with Howard Wainer in 2001.

== Selected publications ==
- David Thissen and Howard Wainer, ed. (2001). Test Scoring. Hillsdale, NJ: Lawrence Erlbaum Associates. ISBN 0-8058-3766-3.
- Alex Roche and Howard Wainer and David Thissen (1976). Skeletal maturity: The knee joint as a biological indicator. New York, NY: Plenum Medical Book Co.
