= BKT =

BKT or bkt can refer to:

- Bak kut teh, a Malaysian and Singaporean dish of pork ribs in broth
- Balkrishna Industries, an Indian tire manufacturer
- Banka Kombëtare Tregtare, a commercial bank in Albania
- Bayesian knowledge tracing, an algorithm used in intelligent tutoring systems
- Berezinskii–Kosterlitz–Thouless transition, a phase transition for two-dimensional systems in condensed matter physics
- Blackstone Army Airfield, a military airfield in Blackstone, Virginia, U.S., by IATA code
- Blake Street railway station, a train station in Birmingham, West Midlands, England, U.K.
- Loki dialect, a language spoken in the Democratic Republic of the Congo, by ISO 639 code
- BKT EuroCup, second-tier professional European basketball club tournament
