= Paul Holland =

Paul Holland may refer to:

- Paul Holland (footballer) (born 1973), English footballer and manager
- Paul W. Holland (born 1940), American statistician

== See also ==
- Paul Holland Knowlton (1787–1863), businessman and political figure in Canada
