= Educational Measurement: Issues and Practice =

Education journal

- Discipline: Education
- Language: English
- Edited by: Deborah J. Harris

Publication details
- History: 1982-present
- Publisher: Wiley-Blackwell on behalf of the National Council on Measurement in Education
- Frequency: Quarterly

Standard abbreviations
- ISO 4: Educ. Meas.

Indexing
- ISSN: 0731-1745 (print); 1745-3992 (web)
- LCCN: 82643496
- OCLC no.: 8128374

Links
- Journal homepage; Online access; Online archive

Educational Measurement: Issues and Practice is a quarterly peer-reviewed academic journal published by Wiley-Blackwell on behalf of the National Council on Measurement in Education. The journal was established in 1982. Its current editor-in-chief is Deborah J. Harris. The journal covers educational measurement in the sense of both inferences made and actions taken on the basis of test scores or other modes of assessment.

Other journals published by NCME include the Journal of Educational Measurement (JEM) and the Chinese/English Journal of Educational Measurement and Evaluation (CEJEME).

== Abstracting and indexing ==
Educational Measurement: Issues and Practice is abstracted and indexed in:

- Academic Search Elite
- Contents Pages in Education
- Education Index/Abstracts
- Educational Research Abstracts Online
- Educational Resources Information Center
- OmniFile
- ProQuest
- PsycINFO/Psychological Abstracts
- Sociology of Education Abstracts
