= Proper linear model =

Statistical model

In statistics, a proper linear model is a linear regression model in which the weights given to the predictor variables are chosen in such a way as to optimize the relationship between the prediction and the criterion. Simple regression analysis is the most common example of a proper linear model. Unit-weighted regression is the most common example of an improper linear model.

== Bibliography ==
- Dawes, R. M. (1979). "The robust beauty of improper linear models in decision making". American Psychologist. 34 (7): 571–582. doi:10.1037/0003-066X.34.7.571. S2CID 14428212.
