= Liff and Benvie =

- Civil parish
- Location within Angus
- Country: Scotland
- Council area: Angus
- Historic county: Forfarshire
- Time zone: UTC+0 (GMT)
  - Summer (DST): UTC+1 (BST)

Liff and Benvie is a historic civil parish in Angus, Scotland. It was created by the union of the ancient parishes of Liff and Benvie in the mid-18th century. The parish lies west of Dundee and includes the settlements of Liff, Benvie, and surrounding rural areas.

== See also ==
- Liff, Angus
- Benvie
- Liff Parish Church
- List of civil parishes of Scotland
