= Bryce Reeve =

American psychometrician

Bryce B. Reeve
- Born: December 31, 1968 (age 57)
- Education: University of North Carolina
- Awards: John Ware and Alvin Tarlov Career Achievement Prize (2015)
- Scientific career
- Fields: Psychometrics; Public health Outcomes research
- Workplaces: University of North Carolina; UNC Gillings School of Global Public Health; UNC Lineberger Comprehensive Cancer Center
- Thesis: Item- and scale-level analysis of clinical and nonclinical sample responses to the MMPI-2 depression scales employing item response theory
- Doctoral advisor: David Thissen

Bryce Byrum Reeve III (born December 31, 1968) is an American psychometrician, outcomes research scientist, professor of Health Policy and Management at the UNC Gillings School of Global Public Health (with an adjunct appointment in the Department of Psychology and Neuroscience), and faculty expert at the UNC Lineberger Comprehensive Cancer Center. He is a prominent figure in quantitative research on improving the measurement of patient-reported health outcomes.

== Career ==
A North Carolina native and graduate of Chapel Hill High School, Reeve earned a bachelor's degree with distinction from the University of North Carolina in 1994 and subsequently worked for several years as a statistical consultant in the Research Triangle area. He returned to UNC to complete a master's (1999) and PhD (2000) in the L. L. Thurstone Psychometric Laboratory under David Thissen. Reeve's doctoral dissertation used item response theory to analyze data from the Minnesota Multiphasic Personality Inventory.

Upon earning his PhD, Reeve worked as a psychometrician and Program Director at the National Cancer Institute. He joined the UNC Gillings School of Global Public Health faculty in 2010, earning tenure four years later. He is currently Full Professor in the Department of Health Policy and Management; Research Fellow at the Cecil G. Sheps Center for Health Services Research; and Adjunct Associate Professor of Quantitative Psychology in the Department of Psychology and Neuroscience.

His record of extramural service includes advisory roles and board memberships with government agencies, nonprofit organizations, and private companies (e.g., PatientsLikeMe) dedicated to patient-centered care and health-related quality of life.

== Research ==
Reeve has been a principal investigator on numerous grants from the National Institutes of Health, the Patient-Centered Outcomes Research Institute, and others. He leads the Patient-Reported Outcomes Measurement Information System research site at the University of North Carolina. He has published hundreds of peer-reviewed journal articles on public health and patient-reported outcomes in addition to nearly one dozen books or book chapters and nearly a hundred abstracts and presentations at scholarly conferences. His work is known for statistical and psychometric rigor, particularly with respect to the application of item response theory to questionnaire design and analysis.

He has received six Awards of Merit from the NIH and, in 2015, received the John Ware and Alvin Tarlov Career Achievement Prize, a major international award for research in patient-reported outcomes.
