= Computational psychometrics =

Computational psychometrics is an interdisciplinary field fusing theory-based psychometrics, learning and cognitive sciences, and data-driven AI-based computational models as applied to large-scale/high-dimensional learning, assessment, biometric, or psychological data. Computational psychometrics is frequently concerned with providing actionable and meaningful feedback to individuals based on measurement and analysis of individual differences as they pertain to specific areas of enquiry.

The relatively recent availability of large-scale psychometric data in accessible formats, alongside the rapid increase in CPU processing power, widespread accessibility and application of cluster and cloud computing, and the development of increasingly sensitive instruments for collecting biometric information has allowed big-data analytical and computational methods to expand the scale and scope of traditional psychometric areas of enquiry and modeling.

Pursuing a computational approach to psychometrics often involves scientists working in multidisciplinary teams with expertise in artificial intelligence, machine learning, deep learning and neural network modeling, natural language processing, mathematics and statistics, developmental and cognitive psychology, computer science, data science, learning sciences, virtual and augmented reality, and traditional psychometrics.

Another important subfield of computational science and, specifically, AI is what has been called psychometric artificial intelligence (PAI). PAI involves the use of psychometrically developed evaluations, such as intelligence tests and thinking style tests, to be solved algorithmically by an artificial agent. The goal of PAI is to put to the test the design and processing mechanisms proposed by AI researchers in order to get knowledge from both artificial and natural cognitive systems.

== Application ==
Computational psychometrics incorporates both theoretical and applied components ranging from item response theory, classical test theory, and Bayesian approaches to modeling knowledge acquisition and discovery of network psychometric models. Computational psychometrics studies the computational basis of learning and measurement of traits, such as skills, knowledge, abilities, attitudes, and personality traits via mathematical modeling, intelligent learning and assessment virtual systems, and computer simulation of large-scale, complex data which traditional psychometric approaches are ill-equipped to handle. Recent investigations into these hard to measure constructs include work on collaborative problem solving, teamwork, and decision making, among others.

Computational psychometrics is also related to the study of social complexity. Concepts such as complex systems and emergence have been considered in the study of team assembly and performance. In psychological and medical research it is focused on computational models based on technology enhanced-experimental results. Active areas of enquiry include cognitive, emotional, behavioral, diagnostic, and mental health issues. A computational psychometrics approach in this capacity frequently makes use of emerging capabilities such as biometric and multimodal sensors, virtual and augmented reality, as well as affective and wearable computing technologies.
