= Journal of Educational Measurement =

- Discipline: Education
- Language: English
- Edited by: Sandip Sinharay

Publication details
- Former names: The Yearbook of the National Council on Measurements Used in Education, The Yearbook of the National Council on Measurement in Education
- History: 1948-present
- Publisher: Wiley-Blackwell for the National Council on Measurement in Education (United States)
- Frequency: Quarterly
- Impact factor: 1.531 (2020)

Standard abbreviations
- ISO 4: J. Educ. Meas.

Indexing
- ISSN: 0022-0655 (print); 1745-3984 (web)

Links
- Journal homepage; Online access; Online archive

The Journal of Educational Measurement is a quarterly peer-reviewed academic journal published by the National Council on Measurement in Education. The journal was established in 1948 and assumed its current name and numbering in 1964. Blackwell Publishing (now Wiley-Blackwell) began publishing the journal for the NCME in 2005. Its current editor-in-chief is Won-Chan Lee of University of Iowa. The previous editors were Chun Wang and Sandip Sinharay. The journal publishes original educational measurement research, provides reviews of measurement publications, and reports on innovative measurement applications.

According to the Journal Citation Reports, the journal has a 2011 impact factor of 1.0, ranking it 9th out of 13 journals in the category "Psychology Mathematical", 31st out of 51 journals in the category "Psychology Educational", and 44th out of 73 journals in the category "Psychology Applied".

Other journals published by NCME include Educational Measurement: Issues and Practice and the Chinese/English Journal of Educational Measurement and Evaluation.
