= Mark Reckase =

Psychometrician

Mark D. Reckase
- Citizenship: Lansing Michigan USA
- Occupation: Professor Emeritus
- Spouse: Charlene (Char) Repenty (died 2017)
- Awards: NCME Award for Career Contributions to Educational Measurement (2016)

Academic background
- Education: University of Illinois at Urbana-Champaign; Syracuse University

Academic work
- Institutions: Michigan State University

Mark Daniel Reckase is an educational psychologist and expert on quantitative methods and measurement who is known for his work on computerized adaptive testing, multidimensional item response theory, and standard setting in educational and psychological tests. Reckase is University Distinguished Professor Emeritus in the College of Education at Michigan State University.

== Awards and honors ==
2016: Career Award from the National Council for Measurement in Education for Contributions to Educational Measurement.

2009: Michigan State University Distinguished Professor

== Biography ==
Reckase graduated from the University of Illinois at Urbana-Champaign in 1966 with a B.S. in psychology. He earned his Ph.D. in psychology from Syracuse University in 1972, where his advisor was Eric F. Gardner. His dissertation was titled Development and application of a multivariate logistic latent trait model.

Reckase began his career on the faculty at University of Missouri in 1972. In 1981, he moved on to a position as Assistant Vice President for Assessment Innovations at ACT. In 1998, he left ACT to join the faculty of the College of Education at Michigan State University. He retired in 2015.

Between December 2001 and November 2006, Reckase was chief editor of the academic journal Applied Psychological Measurement. He has served as President of the International Association for Computerized Adaptive Testing (2017) and as President of the National Council on Measurement in Education (2008-2009).

== Research ==
Reckase specializes in the development of educational and psychological assessments, particularly the psychometric theories underpinning the development of such tests. He has worked extensively in multidimensional item response theory since the beginning of his academic career: his dissertation was on the early development of a multidimensional item response model and he went on to write a book on the topic in 2009. He has branched out into other psychometric areas, like standard setting.

== Books ==
- Reckase, Mark (2022). The psychometrics of standard setting connecting policy and test scores. Boca Raton. ISBN 978-0-429-53098-2. OCLC 1370241241.
- Reckase, Mark (2009). Multidimensional item response theory. New York: Springer. ISBN 978-0-387-89976-3. OCLC 437345698.

== Representative publications ==
- Reckase, M. (1979). Unifactor latent trait models applied to multifactor tests: Results and implications. Journal of Educational Statistics, 4, 207–230.
- Reckase, M. (1985). The difficulty of test items that measure more than one ability. Applied Psychological Measurement, 9, 401–412.
- Reckase, M. (1997). The past and future of multidimensional item response theory. Applied Psychological Measurement, 21, 25–36.
- Reckase, M. (2006). A conceptual framework for a psychometric theory for standard setting with examples of its use for evaluating the functioning of two standard setting methods. Educational Measurement: Issues and Practice, 25, 4–18.
- Reckase, M. D., & McKinley, R. L. (1991). The discriminating power of items that measure more than one dimension. Applied Psychological Measurement, 15(4), 361–373.
