= David J. Weiss =

David J. Weiss is an American psychometrician who has made significant contributions to the field of psychometrics. Alongside Frederic M. Lord, Weiss is considered a pioneer in the development and application of computerized adaptive testing

Weiss earned his bachelor's degree in psychology from the University of Pennsylvania in 1959. Thereafter, he pursued doctoral studies in the subject at the University of Minnesota, graduating in 1963. After earning his doctorate, he remained and joined the faculty of the University of Minnesota. Weiss is the founding editor-in-chief of the academic journal Applied Psychological Measurement, serving from January 1977 to December 2001.

Weiss is a fellow of the American Psychological Association and the American Educational Research Association.
