= David Rindskopf =

American psychologist

David Marcus Rindskopf
- Born: 1948 (age 77–78)
- Education: Iowa State University
- Scientific career
- Fields: psychology, statistics
- Workplaces: Northwestern University, City University of New York
- Thesis: A comparison of various regression-correlation methods for evaluating nonexperimental research (1976)
- Doctoral advisor: Leroy Wolins

David Rindskopf is an American psychologist and applied statistician, currently a distinguished professor at the Graduate Center of the City University of New York, and a published author of both books and many articles in refereed journals. He is a Fellow of the American Statistical Association (ASA), was the President of its New York section, and American Educational Research Association (AERA) and also former editor of the ASA-AERA journal Journal of Educational and Behavioral Statistics.

Dr. Rindskopf has served as an expert witness and is a statistical consultant and has been an invited speaker at conferences in England, Germany, Belgium, and Holland.

Rindskopf was an undergraduate at Antioch College and Iowa State University where he received a bachelor's degree with a double major in mathematics and psychology. He completed his doctorate in psychology with a specialization in statistics and research methodology at Iowa State University. He was a post-doctoral fellow in research and statistics at Northwestern University in Evanston, Illinois. He joined the CUNY faculty in 1979.
