= Mark L. Davison =

Mark Leonard Davison is an American psychometrician.

Davison earned his undergraduate degree from Augustana College in 1970. He completed his doctoral dissertation, titled Fitting a Set of Points to a Space Defined by a Second Set: An Extension of Multidimensional Scaling and Unfolding Models, at the University of Illinois Urbana-Champaign in 1974, where he was advised by Lawrence E. Jones. Davison subsequently taught at the University of Minnesota as the John P. Yackel Professor in Educational Assessment and Measurement.

Davison was chief editor of the academic journal Applied Psychological Measurement from January 2007 to November 2012. He is a fellow of the American Psychological Association.
