= Association of Test Publishers =

The Association of Test Publishers or ATP is an established non-profit trade association representing providers of tests and assessment tools and/or services related to assessment, selection, screening, certification, licensing, educational or clinical uses. It was founded in 1992 following the dissolution of its predecessor, the Association of Personnel Test Publishers (APTP).

In 2001, the ATP published the Guidelines for Computer-Based Testing and the Internet, which addressed testing via electronic devices. In 2006, the ATP published a survey of 77 companies in which about half reported that their IT certification exams were available for sale on the internet, along with widespread reports of cheating on those exams.
