= Paul W. Holland =

American statistician (born 1940)

Paul William Holland (born 25 April 1940) is an American statistician. He has worked on a wide range of fields including: categorical data analysis, social network analysis and causal inference in program evaluation.

Paul Holland was born in Tulsa, Oklahoma. He attended the University of Michigan as an undergraduate, and Stanford University for a master's and doctorate in statistics, supervised by Patrick Suppes. Michigan State University and Harvard University were his first teaching posts. He started at Educational Testing Service in 1975. From 1993 to 2000 he taught at University of California, Berkeley, before returning to Educational Testing Service.

He held the Frederic M. Lord Chair in Measurement and Statistics at the Educational Testing Service.

== Selected publications ==
- Paul W. Holland & Samuel Leinhardt (editors) (1979) Perspectives on Social Network Research, Academic Press ISBN 9780123525505, proceedings on structural balance theory
- Holland, P. W. (1986) "Statistics and causal inference", Journal of the American Statistical Association 81(396): 945-960.
- Holland, P. W., & Welsch, R. E. (1977) "Robust regression using iteratively reweighted least-squares", Communications in Statistics-theory and Methods 6(9): 813-827.
- Holland, P. W., & Howard Wainer (editors) (2012) Differential Item Functioning. Routledge ISBN 9781138967694
