= Fumiko Yoneyama =

Japanese politician (1902–1998)

- 米山 文子

Member of the House of Representatives
- In office 10 April 1946 – 31 March 1947
- Preceded by: Constituency established
- Succeeded by: Multi-member district
- Constituency: Yamagata at-large

Personal details
- Born: 25 April 1902 Tokyo, Japan
- Died: 2 January 1998 (aged 95)
- Party: Democratic
- Other political affiliations: Chudokai (1946–1947)
- Education: Tokyo Gakugei University

Fumiko Yoneyama (Japanese: 米山文子; 25 April 1902 – 2 January 1998) was a Japanese politician. She was one of the first group of women elected to the House of Representatives in 1946.

== Biography ==
Yoneyama was born in the Kojimachi ward of Tokyo in 1902. She attended Tokyo Women's Normal School, after which she worked as a primary school teacher. She married Hachiya Yoneyama and the couple were evacuated to Akayu in Yamagata Prefecture in 1944.

In 1945 she retired from teaching and joined the new Chudokai (Middle Way Society) party established by her husband and became head of its women's section. She contested the 1946 general elections as a Chudokai candidate in Yamagata, and was elected to the House of Representatives. She ran for re-election in 1947 as a Democratic Party candidate, but was unsuccessful.
