= Liff Parish Church =

Coordinates: 56°28′58″N 3°05′04″W

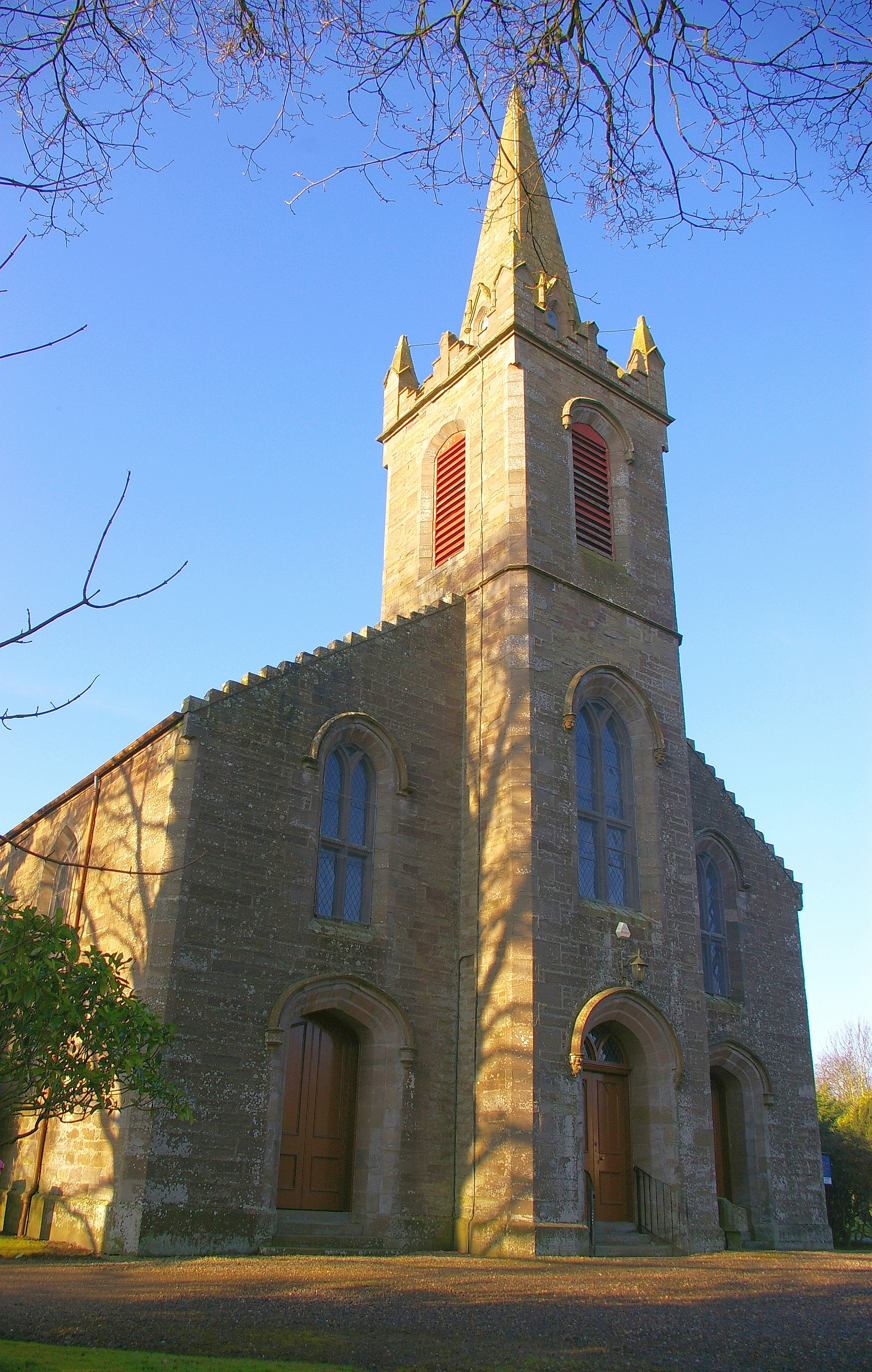
- Liff Parish Church in Liff, Angus
- Location: Liff, Angus
- Country: Scotland
- Denomination: Church of Scotland
- Previous denomination: Roman Catholic (pre-Reformation)
- Churchmanship: Presbyterian

History
- Status: Parish church

Architecture
- Functional status: Active
- Architect: William Macdonald Mackenzie

Liff Parish Church is a Church of Scotland parish church in the village of Liff, Angus, Scotland. The present church was completed in 1839 and was designed by the architect William Macdonald Mackenzie. It replaced an earlier parish church dating from the 18th century which itself had succeeded the medieval church serving the historic parish of Liff.
