= Smart Sparrow =

Australian educational technology company

- Type: Technology
- Industry: Internet, Education
- Founded: 2010
- Headquarters: Sydney, Australia
- Key people: Dror Ben-Naim: CEO / founder Shaowei Ho: Co-Founder, Head of Platform Experience Zack Belinson: Co-Founder, Head of Content Services
- Website: smartsparrow.com

Smart Sparrow is an ed-tech (education technology) start-up, the commercialization of an adaptive learning technology incubated within the Adaptive eLearning Research Group at the School of Computer Science and Engineering at the University of New South Wales in Sydney, Australia.

Adaptive learning is an educational method using computers as interactive teaching devices, adapting educational material according to students' learning needs. The technology incorporates the interactivity previously only afforded by an actual human teacher, and integrates ideas from various fields, including computer science, education, and psychology.

The Smart Sparrow software tools, known collectively as the Adaptive eLearning Platform, are a web-based suite that develops adaptive learning content and applications, deploys that material to students and analyses how students learn from their responses to the material. The platform implements an intelligent tutoring system that combines Constraint-Based Modeling with Model Tracing.

In 2013, an educational white paper "LEARNING TO ADAPT: A Case for Accelerating Adaptive Learning in Higher Education" identified Smart Sparrow as one of six ‘notable’ adaptive learning platform providers.

The same paper, part of a study funded by the Bill & Melinda Gates Foundation, cited the impact of the Smart Sparrow platform on increasing enrollments and reducing dropouts. Other studies cite accelerated learning times with the platform.

By 2013, the platform had become the basis of Australia's national Biomedical Education Skills and Training Network, and was being integrated into tertiary courses in differing disciplines at universities in the US and Australia. By later that year, Smart Sparrow was being deployed in Australian high schools, as part of a collaborative partnership with Australian universities to improve student engagement in mathematics and science.

In January 2020, Smart Sparrow was acquired by Pearson Education
