= Educational measurement =

Assessments to infer the abilities and proficiencies of students

Educational measurement refers to the use of educational assessments and the analysis of data such as scores obtained from educational assessments to infer the abilities and proficiencies of students. The approaches overlap with those in psychometrics. Educational measurement is the assigning of numerals to traits such as achievement, interest, attitudes, aptitudes, intelligence and performance.

== Overview ==
The aim of theory and practice in educational measurement is typically to measure abilities and levels of attainment by students in areas such as reading, writing, mathematics, science and so forth. Traditionally, attention focuses on whether assessments are reliable and valid. In practice, educational measurement is largely concerned with the analysis of data from educational assessments or tests. Typically, this means using total scores on assessments, whether they are multiple choice or open-ended and marked using marking rubrics or guides.

In technical terms, the pattern of scores by individual students to individual items is used to infer so-called scale locations of students, the "measurements". This process is one form of scaling. Essentially, higher total scores give higher scale locations, consistent with the traditional and everyday use of total scores. If certain theory is used, though, there is not a strict correspondence between the ordering of total scores and the ordering of scale locations. The Rasch model provides a strict correspondence provided all students attempt the same test items, or their performances are marked using the same marking rubrics.

In terms of the broad body of purely mathematical theory drawn on, there is substantial overlap between educational measurement and psychometrics. However, certain approaches considered to be a part of psychometrics, including Classical test theory, Item Response Theory and the Rasch model, were originally developed more specifically for the analysis of data from educational assessments.

One of the aims of applying theory and techniques in educational measurement is to try to place the results of different tests administered to different groups of students on a single or common scale through processes known as test equating. The rationale is that because different assessments usually have different difficulties, the total scores cannot be directly compared. The aim of trying to place results on a common scale is to allow comparison of the scale locations inferred from the totals via scaling processes.
