= Applied Psychological Measurement =

- Discipline: Applied psychology
- Language: English
- Edited by: John R. Donoghue

Publication details
- History: 1977-present
- Publisher: SAGE Publications
- Frequency: 8/year
- Impact factor: 1.522 (2021)

Standard abbreviations
- ISO 4: Appl. Psychol. Meas.

Indexing
- ISSN: 0146-6216 (print); 1552-3497 (web)
- LCCN: 77648326
- OCLC no.: 2998464

Links
- Journal homepage; Online access; Online archive

Applied Psychological Measurement is a peer-reviewed academic journal published by SAGE Publications. The journal covers research on methodologies and research on the application of psychological measurement in psychology and related disciplines, as well as reviews of books and computer programs. The journal's editor-in-chief is John R. Donoghue (Educational Testing Service). Applied Psychological Measurement was featured in ScienceWatch in May 2011, as the number of citations to the journal placed it among highly cited journals in the fields of psychiatry and psychology.

== Abstracting and indexing ==
Applied Psychological Measurement is abstracted and indexed in Scopus and the Social Sciences Citation Index. According to the Journal Citation Reports, its 2021 impact factor is 1.522, ranking it 9th out of 13 journals in the category "Psychology, Mathematical" 38th out of 53 in the category "Social Sciences, Mathematical Models".

== Chief editors ==
- David J. Weiss (1977–2001)
- Mark Reckase (2002–2006)
- Mark L. Davison (2007–2012)
- Hua-Hua Chang (2012–2019)
- John R. Donoghue
