= Multistage testing =

Multistage testing is an algorithm-based approach to administering tests. It is very similar to computer-adaptive testing in that items are interactively selected for each examinee by the algorithm, but rather than selecting individual items, groups of items are selected, building the test in stages. These groups are called testlets or panels.

While multistage tests could theoretically be administered by a human, the extensive computations required (often using item response theory) mean that multistage tests are administered by computer.

The number of stages or testlets can vary. If the testlets are relatively small, such as five items, ten or more could easily be used in a test. Some multistage tests are designed with the minimum of two stages (one stage would be a conventional fixed-form test).

In response to the increasing use of multistage testing, the scholarly journal Applied Measurement in Education published a special edition on the topic in 2006.
