= National Council on Measurement in Education =

US association for educational assessment, evaluation and testing

The National Council on Measurement in Education (NCME) is a U.S. based professional organization for assessment, evaluation, testing, and other aspects of educational measurement. NCME was launched in 1938 and previously operated under the name National Council on Measurements Used in Education.

NCME professionals work in evaluation, testing, program evaluation, and, more generally, educational and psychological measurement. Members come from universities, test development organizations, and industry. A goal of the organization is to ensure that assessment is fair and equitable for all students.

NCME's Educational Measurement: Issues and Practice journal is accessible for all NCME members.

== See also ==
- Psychometrics
