= Stephen G. West =

American psychologist (born 1946)

- Born: 1946 (age 79–80); Los Angeles, California
- Education: Cornell University; University of Texas at Austin
- Awards: Murray Award from the Society for Personality and Social Psychology (2000)
- Scientific career
- Fields: Quantitative psychology
- Institutions: Arizona State University
- Thesis: The effects of physiological arousal, cognitive labels, and high and low correspondence actions on attribution and behavior (1973)

Stephen Gano West (born 1946) is an American quantitative psychologist and professor of psychology at Arizona State University. He was the editor-in-chief of the Journal of Personality from 1986 to 1991, of Psychological Methods from 2001 to 2007, and of Multivariate Behavioral Research in 2015. He was also the president of the Society of Multivariate Experimental Psychology from 2007 to 2008. He was educated at Cornell University and the University of Texas at Austin, and received the Society for Personality and Social Psychology's Murray Award in 2000.
