= Patrick J. Curran =

American psychologist and statistician

- Born: May 9, 1965 (age 61)
- Education: University of Colorado; Arizona State University
- Awards: Society of Multivariate Experimental Psychology Tanaka Award (2006); Association for Psychological Science Fellow (2007); Chapman Family Teaching Award (2012)
- Scientific career
- Fields: Psychology
- Workplaces: UCLA; Duke University; University of North Carolina
- Thesis: The robustness of confirmatory factor analysis to model misspecification and violations of normality
- Doctoral advisors: Stephen West; Laurie Chassin

Patrick James Curran (born May 9, 1965) is an American psychologist and statistician. He is a professor of quantitative psychology at the University of North Carolina, where he is also a faculty member at the Center for Developmental Science.

He is the coauthor of Latent Curve Models: A Structural Equation Perspective (with Ken Bollen) and is known broadly in the social sciences for teaching and research on the measurement and analysis of longitudinal data.

He is co-host, along with Gregory R. Hancock, of Quantitude, a podcast focusing on quantitative methodology.

== Career ==
Curran earned a bachelor's degree magna cum laude from the University of Colorado Boulder in 1987 and a PhD in clinical psychology with an emphasis in quantitative methodology from Arizona State University in 1994. He completed a postdoctoral fellowship in applied statistics at the University of California, Los Angeles under Bengt O. Muthén, the creator of the Mplus statistical program.

He became an assistant professor of psychology at Duke University in 1996. He moved three years later to UNC, where he was promoted to associate professor in 2002 and full professor in 2006. He was Director of the L. L. Thurstone Psychometric Laboratory from 2010 to 2017.

=== Extramural service ===
Curran serves on the editorial boards or as a consulting editor of several prominent journals in the field of psychology, including Multivariate Behavioral Research and Journal of Abnormal Psychology.

In 2008, he cofounded Curran–Bauer Analytics, a consulting firm based in Durham, North Carolina. He has taught doctoral-level quantitative workshops to more than 1,000 students and research scientists across six countries.

== Research ==
Curran's program of methodological research encompasses structural equation modeling, multilevel modeling, and latent growth curve modeling of longitudinal data. In addition, as a principal investigator on several grants from the National Institute on Drug Abuse, he conducts applied research in developmental psychopathology in general and on the risk factors of adolescent substance use in particular.

He has published extensively in books and peer-reviewed journals and has been cited in the scholarly literature more than 40,000 times.

=== Selected publications ===
- Curran, P. J., Cole, V., Bauer, D. J., Hussong, A. M., & Gottfredson, N. (2016). Improving factor score estimation through the use of observed background characteristics. Structural Equation Modeling, 23(6), 827–844.
- Curran, P. J., Howard, A. L., Bainter, S. A., Lane, S. T., & McGinley, J. S. (2014). The separation of between-person and within-person components of individual change over time: A latent curve model with structured residuals. Journal of Consulting and Clinical Psychology, 82(5), 879.
- Curran, P. J., McGinley, J. S., Bauer, D. J., Hussong, A. M., Burns, A., Chassin, L., ... & Zucker, R. (2014). A moderated nonlinear factor model for the development of commensurate measures in integrative data analysis. Multivariate Behavioral Research, 49(3), 214–231.
- Curran, P. J., & Hussong, A. M. (2009). Integrative data analysis: the simultaneous analysis of multiple data sets. Psychological Methods, 14(2), 81.
- Curran, P. J., Hussong, A. M., Cai, L., Huang, W., Chassin, L., Sher, K. J., & Zucker, R. A. (2008). Pooling data from multiple longitudinal studies: The role of item response theory in integrative data analysis. Developmental Psychology, 44(2), 365.
- Curran, P. J., & Bauer, D. J. (2007). Building path diagrams for multilevel models. Psychological Methods, 12(3), 283.
- Curran, P. J., Bauer, D. J., & Willoughby, M. T. (2004). Testing main effects and interactions in latent curve analysis. Psychological Methods, 9(2), 220.
- Curran, P. J., Bollen, K. A., Chen, F., Paxton, P., & Kirby, J. B. (2003). Finite sampling properties of the point estimates and confidence intervals of the RMSEA. Sociological Methods & Research, 32(2), 208–252.
- Curran, P. J., & Willoughby, M. T. (2003). Implications of latent trajectory models for the study of developmental psychopathology. Development and Psychopathology, 15(03), 581–612.
- Curran, P. J., & Hussong, A. M. (2003). The use of latent trajectory models in psychopathology research. Journal of Abnormal Psychology, 112(4), 526.
- Curran, P. J. (2003). Have multilevel models been structural equation models all along?. Multivariate Behavioral Research, 38(4), 529–569.
- Curran, P. J., Bollen, K. A., Paxton, P., Kirby, J., & Chen, F. (2002). The noncentral chi-square distribution in misspecified structural equation models: Finite sample results from a Monte Carlo simulation. Multivariate Behavioral Research, 37(1), 1-36.
- Curran, P. J., & Bollen, K. A. (2001). The best of both worlds: Combining autoregressive and latent curve models.
- Curran, P. J., & Muthén, B. O. (1999). The application of latent curve analysis to testing developmental theories in intervention research. American Journal of Community Psychology, 27(4), 567–595.
- Curran, P. J., Muthén, B. O., & Harford, T. C. (1998). The influence of changes in marital status on developmental trajectories of alcohol use in young adults. Journal of Studies on Alcohol, 59(6), 647–658.
- Curran, P. J., Stice, E., & Chassin, L. (1997). The relation between adolescent alcohol use and peer alcohol use. Journal of Consulting and Clinical Psychology, 65(1), 130–140.
- Curran, P. J., & Chassin, L. (1996). A longitudinal study of parenting as a protective factor for children of alcoholics. Journal of Studies on Alcohol, 57(3), 305–313.
- Curran, P. J., West, S. G., & Finch, J. F. (1996). The robustness of test statistics to nonnormality and specification error in confirmatory factor analysis. Psychological Methods, 1(1), 16–29.
