= Kathleen Gates =

American neuroscientist

Katie Gates
- Education: Michigan State University; City University of New York; Pennsylvania State University
- Known for: Group Iterative Multiple Model Estimation (GIMME) algorithm
- Scientific career
- Fields: Neuroscience; Quantitative psychology
- Workplaces: University of North Carolina
- Thesis: Novel estimation method for arriving at group connectivity maps with fMRI data
- Doctoral advisors: Michael Rovine; Peter Molenaar

Kathleen Marie "Katie" Gates is an American neuroscientist, quantitative psychologist, and faculty member in the L. L. Thurstone Psychometric Laboratory at the University of North Carolina at Chapel Hill. She is known for her contributions to network analysis, time series analysis, and structural equation modeling toward the development and dissemination of methods for quantifying intra-individual change and person-specific processes as they unfold across time.

She and Peter Molenaar are co-inventors of GIMME, an algorithm for finding mathematical models of psychophysiological processes across time.

== Career ==
A native of Troy, Michigan, Gates earned a bachelor's degree from Michigan State University, a master's degree in forensic psychology from the John Jay College of Criminal Justice at the City University of New York, and a PhD in human development and family studies with a focus in quantitative methods from Pennsylvania State University. She joined the Psychology and Neuroscience faculty at the University of North Carolina in 2013.

She is an elected member of the Society of Multivariate Experimental Psychology.

== Research ==
Gates publishes statistical methods for the analysis of intensive longitudinal data. Her primary source of funding is the National Institute of Biomedical Imaging and Bioengineering.

=== Selected publications ===
- Gates, K. M., Molenaar, P. C., Hillary, F. G., Ram, N., & Rovine, M. J. (2010). "Automatic search for fMRI connectivity mapping: an alternative to Granger causality testing using formal equivalences among SEM path modeling, VAR, and unified SEM". NeuroImage, 50(3), 1118–1125.
- Gates, K. M., Molenaar, P. C., Hillary, F. G., & Slobounov, S. (2011). "Extended unified SEM approach for modeling event-related fMRI data". NeuroImage, 54(2), 1151–1158.
- Gates, K. M., & Molenaar, P. C. (2012). "Group search algorithm recovers effective connectivity maps for individuals in homogeneous and heterogeneous samples". NeuroImage, 63(1), 310–319.
- Gates, K. M., Molenaar, P. C., Iyer, S. P., Nigg, J. T., & Fair, D. A. (2014). "Organizing heterogeneous samples using community detection of GIMME-derived resting state functional networks". PLOS ONE, 9(3), e91322.
- Gates, K. M., Gatzke‐Kopp, L. M., Sandsten, M., & Blandon, A. Y. (2015). "Estimating time‐varying RSA to examine psychophysiological linkage of marital dyads". Psychophysiology, 52(8), 1059–1065.
- Gates, K. M., & Liu, S. (2016). "Methods for quantifying patterns of dynamic interactions in dyads". Assessment, 23(4), 459–471.
