= Gideon J. Mellenbergh =

Dutch psychologist (1938–2021)

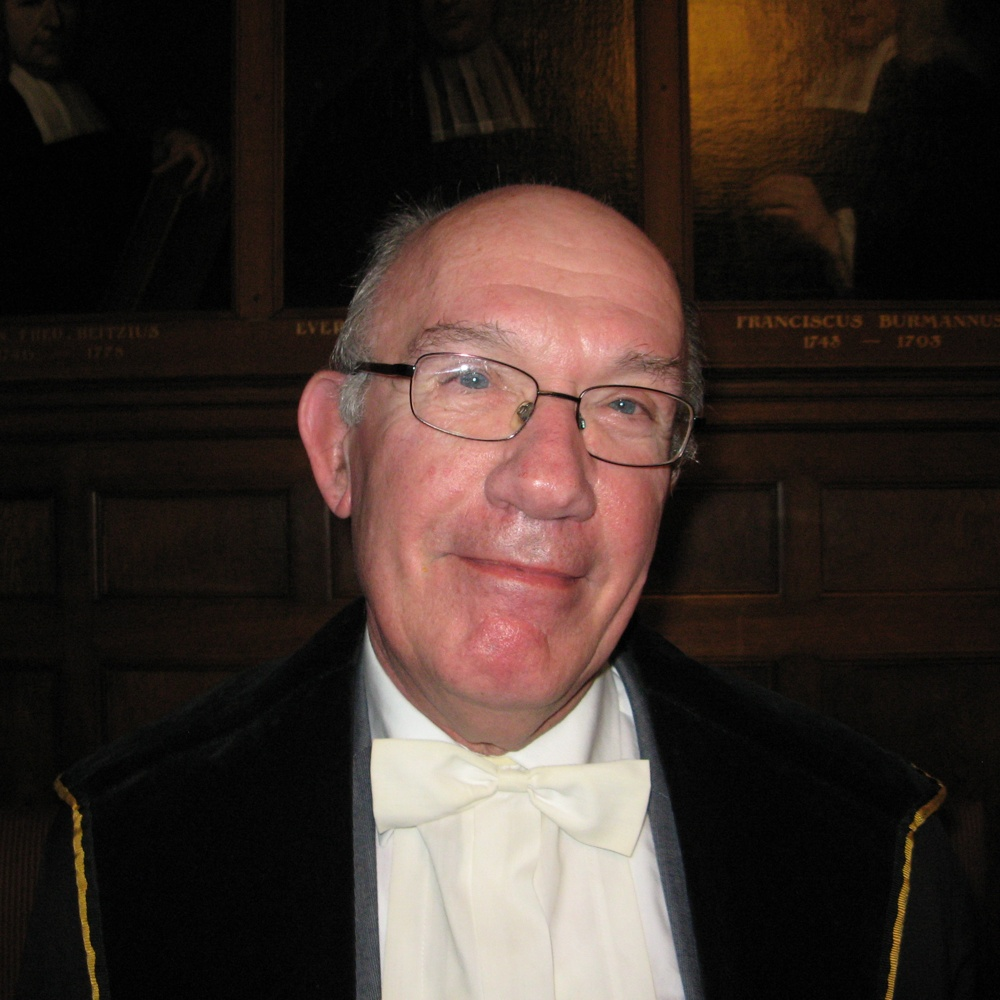
- Don Mellenbergh, 2009
- Born: 9 August 1938; Amsterdam
- Died: 27 March 2021 (aged 82)
- Education: University of Amsterdam
- Scientific career
- Fields: Psychologist
- Workplaces: University of Amsterdam
- Thesis: Studies on educational tests (1971)
- Doctoral advisor: Adriaan de Groot
- Doctoral students: Herman J. Adèr, Henk van der Flier, Joop Hox, Edith de Leeuw

Gideon Jan (Don) Mellenbergh (9 August 1938 – 27 March 2021) was a Dutch psychologist, who was Professor of Psychological methods at the University of Amsterdam, known for his contribution in the field of psychometrics, and Social Research Methodology.

== Biography ==
Born and raised in Amsterdam, Mellenbergh received his MA in psychology from the University of Amsterdam in 1965, and his PhD in psychology in 1971 under the supervision of Professor Adriaan de Groot with a dissertation about educational tests, entitled "Studies in studietoetsen" (Studies on educational tests).

At the University of Amsterdam, Mellenbergh began his academic career as an assistant professor of psychological methods in 1965. Late 1969 he was visiting research assistant at the University of Chicago, studying educational methods. From 1975 to 1978 he was Associate professor Psychometrics at the University of Utrecht, and then returned to the University of Amsterdam where he was Professor, Psychological Methods from 1982 to 2003. Among his PhD students were Henk Koppelaar and Denny Borsboom. In 1991 and 1993 he had been Visiting professor at the University of Santiago de Compostela, Spain.

Mellenbergh performed many administrative functions in Dutch research institutes, is member of the Royal Netherlands Academy of Arts and Sciences (KNAW) since 1993, the Psychometric Society, the American Psychological Association (APA), the International Statistical Institute (ISI), and the Interuniversity Graduate School of Psychometrics and Sociometrics (IOPS). And Mellenbergh was editor at Psychometrika, on the editorial Board of Psychological Methods and member of the editorial council of Psicothema.

He died on 27 March 2021.

== Publications ==
Books and papers, a selection:

- 1970. An Application of a Model of Rasch
- 1999. Research Methodology in the Social, Behavioural and Life Sciences. With Herman J. Ader
- 2008 Advising on Research Methods: a consultant's companion. With Herman J. Adèr and David J. Hand (eds.). Johannes van Kessel Publ. p. 244.
- 2011. A Conceptual Introduction to Psychometrics

Articles, a selection:

- Flier, H., Mellenbergh, G. J., Adèr, H. J., & Wijn, M. (1984). An iterative item bias detection method. Journal of educational measurement, 21(2), 131-145.
