= Daniel J. Bauer =

American statistician and psychologist

- Born: June 29, 1973 (age 53)
- Education: Trinity University; University of North Carolina
- Awards: SMEP Cattell Award (2004); SMEP Tanaka Award (2006); APA Distinguished Scientific Award for an Early Career Contribution to Psychology (2009); Distinguished Teaching Award for Post-Baccalaureate Instruction (2016)
- Scientific career
- Fields: Psychology
- Workplaces: North Carolina State University; University of North Carolina
- Thesis: Reactivity and the regulation of social interactions in high- and low-aggressive mice
- Doctoral advisor: Jean-Louis Gariépy

Daniel John Bauer (born June 29, 1973) is an American statistician, professor, and director of the quantitative psychology program at the University of North Carolina, where he is also on the faculty at the Center for Developmental Science. He is known for rigorous methodological work on latent variable models and is a proponent of integrative data analysis, a meta-analytic technique that pools raw data across multiple independent studies.

== Career ==
Bauer graduated from Trinity University in 1994 with a major in psychology, minors in mathematics and history, and a concentration in computer science. He was a research coordinator at the Baylor College of Medicine prior to graduate school.

He earned a PhD in developmental psychology from the University of North Carolina at Chapel Hill in 2000. He completed a postdoctoral fellowship in applied statistics at UNC's Odum Institute for Research in Social Science, whereupon he joined the quantitative and developmental psychology faculty at North Carolina State University. He returned to UNC in 2004 as an assistant professor in the L. L. Thurstone Psychometric Laboratory. In addition, during that year, he was elected to the Society of Multivariate Experimental Psychology and became a faculty associate at the Statistical and Applied Mathematical Sciences Institute, leading a group for multilevel latent variable models.

He was promoted to associate professor in 2008 and full professor in 2013.

=== Extramural service ===
Bauer serves on the editorial boards of Psychological Assessment, Psychological Methods, and the Journal of Educational and Behavioral Statistics. He is an editor of or reviewer for dozens of other journals.

In 2008, he cofounded the Curran–Bauer Analytics consulting firm with Patrick Curran, a colleague in the Thurstone Lab, and has taught numerous doctoral-level workshops in quantitative methods to social scientists worldwide. He was recognized by UNC in 2016 "for exceptional teaching of post-baccalaureate students."

== Research ==
Bauer has published widely in factor analysis, multilevel modeling, latent growth curves, mixture models, latent class models, structural equation modeling, and item response theory. He has presented his work at numerous conferences and has been cited in the scholarly literature more than 10,000 times.

As the recipient of various grants from the National Institute of Mental Health, the National Institute on Drug Abuse, and the Eunice Kennedy Shriver National Institute of Child Health and Human Development, he conducts applied research in psychopathology and negative health behaviors such as adolescent substance use.

=== Selected publications ===
- Bauer, D.J. (2016). "A more general model for testing measurement invariance and differential item functioning". Psychological Methods. 22 (3): 507–526. doi:10.1037/met0000077. PMC 5140785. PMID 27266798.
- Bauer, D.J.; Gottfredson, N.C.; Dean, D.; Zucker, R.A. (2013). "Analyzing repeated measures data on individuals nested within groups: accounting for dynamic group effects". Psychological Methods. 18 (1): 1–14. doi:10.1037/a0030639. PMC 3638804. PMID 23148474.
- Bauer, D.J.; Howard, A.L.; Baldasaro, R.E.; Curran, P.J.; Hussong, A.M.; Chassin, L.; Zucker, R.A. (2013). "A trifactor model for integrating ratings across multiple informants". Psychological Methods. 18 (4): 475–493. doi:10.1037/a0032475. PMC 3964937. PMID 24079932.
- Bauer, D.J.; Baldasaro, R.; Gottfredson, N.C. (2012). "Diagnostic procedures for detecting nonlinear relationships between latent variables". Structural Equation Modeling. 19 (2): 157–177. doi:10.1080/10705511.2012.659612.
- Bauer, D.J. (2011). "Evaluating individual differences in psychological processes". Current Directions in Psychological Science. 20 (2): 115–118. doi:10.1177/0963721411402670.
- Bauer, D.J.; Sterba, S.K. (2011). "Fitting multilevel models with ordinal outcomes: performance of alternative specifications and methods of estimation". Psychological Methods. 16 (4): 373–390. doi:10.1037/a0025813. PMC 3252624. PMID 22040372.
- Bauer, D.J.; Reyes, H.L.M. (2010). "Modeling variability in individual development: differences of degree or kind?". Child Development Perspectives. 4 (2): 114–122. doi:10.1111/j.1750-8606.2010.00129.x. PMC 4045646. PMID 24910711.
- Bauer, D.J. (2009). "A note on comparing the estimates of models for cluster-correlated or longitudinal data with binary or ordinal outcomes". Psychometrika. 74: 97–105. doi:10.1007/s11336-008-9080-1.
- Bauer, D.J.; Cai, L. (2009). "Consequences of unmodeled nonlinear effects in multilevel models". Journal of Educational and Behavioral Statistics. 34: 97–114. doi:10.3102/1076998607310504.
- Bauer, D.J.; Hussong, A.M (2009). "Psychometric approaches for developing commensurate measures across independent studies: traditional and new models". Psychological Methods. 14 (2): 101–125. doi:10.1037/a0015583. PMC 2780030. PMID 19485624.
- Bauer, D.J.; Sterba, S.K.; Hallfors, D.D. (2008). "Evaluating group-based interventions when control participants are ungrouped". Multivariate Behavioral Research. 43 (2): 210–236. doi:10.1080/00273170802034810. PMC 2853949. PMID 20396621.
- Bauer, D.J. (2007). "Observations on the use of growth mixture models in psychological research". Multivariate Behavioral Research. 42 (4): 757–786. doi:10.1080/00273170701710338.
- Bauer, D.J.; Preacher, K.J.; Gil, K.M. (2006). "Conceptualizing and testing random indirect effects and moderated mediation in multilevel models: new procedures and recommendations". Psychological Methods. 11 (2): 142–163. doi:10.1037/1082-989X.11.2.142. hdl:1808/1488. PMID 16784335.
- Bauer, D.J. (2005). "The role of nonlinear factor-to-indicator relationships in tests of measurement equivalence". Psychological Methods. 10 (3): 305–316. doi:10.1037/1082-989X.10.3.305. PMID 16221030.
- Bauer, D.J. (2005). "A semiparametric approach to modeling nonlinear relations among latent variables". Structural Equation Modeling. 12 (4): 513–535. doi:10.1207/s15328007sem1204_1.
- Bauer, D.J.; Curran, P.J. (2005). "Probing interactions in fixed and multilevel regression: inferential and graphical techniques". Multivariate Behavioral Research. 40 (3): 373–400. doi:10.1207/s15327906mbr4003_5. PMID 26794689.
- Bauer, D.J.; Curran, P.J. (2004). "The integration of continuous and discrete latent variable models: potential problems and promising opportunities". Psychological Methods. 9: 3–29. doi:10.1037/1082-989X.9.1.3. PMID 15053717.
- Bauer, D.J. (2003). "Estimating multilevel linear models as structural equation models". Journal of Educational and Behavioral Statistics. 28 (2): 135–167. doi:10.3102/10769986028002135.
- Bauer, D.J.; Curran, P.J. (2003). "Distributional assumptions of growth mixture models: Implications for over-extraction of latent trajectory classes". Psychological Methods. 8 (3): 338–363. doi:10.1037/1082-989X.8.3.338. PMID 14596495.

== See also ==
- Patrick J. Curran
