= Joseph Lee Rodgers =

American psychologist

Joseph Lee Rodgers III
- Born: February 9, 1953 (age 73)
- Citizenship: American
- Education: University of Oklahoma University of North Carolina at Chapel Hill
- Spouse: Jacci Rodgers
- Children: 2
- Awards: Fellow of the American Association for the Advancement of Science
- Scientific career
- Fields: Quantitative psychology
- Workplaces: University of Oklahoma; Vanderbilt University
- Thesis: Effects of Family Configuration on Mental Development (1981)
- Doctoral advisor: Vaida Thompson

Joseph Lee Rodgers III (born February 9, 1953) is an American psychologist who specializes in quantitative psychology and topics in developmental psychology and social biology. He is the Lois Autrey Betts Professor of Psychology and Human Development Emeritus at Vanderbilt University, and he is also the George Lynn Cross Research Professor Emeritus at the University of Oklahoma, where he taught from 1981 to 2012.

== Education and career ==
Rodgers graduated from the University of Oklahoma in 1975 with a B.S. in mathematics and a B.A. in psychology. He received his Ph.D. in quantitative psychology from the University of North Carolina at Chapel Hill in 1981, with a minor in biostatistics. His dissertation was on the effects of family configuration on mental development.

He is a past president of the Society for the Study of Social Biology, the Society of Multivariate Experimental Psychology, and Divisions 5 and 34 of the American Psychological Association. From 2006 to 2011, he was editor-in-chief of Multivariate Behavioral Research. He has been a fellow of the American Association for the Advancement of Science since 2012.

His substantive research has focused on topics such as the relationship between birth order and human intelligence, as well as adolescent risk behaviors, like sexual activity and drug use. His methodological research focuses on behavior genetics, exploratory data analysis, correlation and regression, and best practices for research methods.
