= Jeffrey S. Tanaka =

American psychologist and statistician

Jeffrey Scott Tanaka
- Born: 1958; Los Angeles, California, United States
- Died: November 3, 1992 (aged 34); Bondville, Illinois, United States
- Occupation: Professor of educational psychology

Academic background
- Education: University of California, Los Angeles (A.B., M.A., PhD)

Academic work
- Discipline: Psychologist
- Institutions: New York University; University of Illinois at Urbana–Champaign
- Main interests: Psychometrics, multivariate statistics, social psychology, cognition, information processing

Jeffrey Scott Tanaka (1958 – November 3, 1992) was an American psychologist and statistician, known for his work in educational psychology, social psychology and various fields of statistics including structural equation modeling.

== Biography ==
Tanaka was born in Los Angeles in 1958 to parents Margaret and Shoji Tanaka. In 1979, Tanaka received an A.B. (cum laude) in quantitative psychology at UCLA, followed by an M.A. in psychology in 1980 and a PhD in psychometrics in 1984.

His professional academic career began at New York University (NYU), where he was assistant professor of psychology from 1983. In 1990, he joined the University of Illinois, Urbana-Champaign as associate professor while continuing his career at NYU as visiting research associate professor.

Tanaka applied himself in a wide range of fields. As a psychologist, he worked in social psychology, educational psychology and cognition. In statistics, his research interests included structural equation modeling, factor analysis and categorical data analysis.

On November 3, 1992, Tanaka died in an automobile accident near Bondville, Illinois at the age of 34.

== Legacy ==
Due to his work with the American Psychological Association (APA) in raising awareness for ethnic minority issues in academia (Tanaka was an ethnic minority himself), the APA named their Jeffrey S. Tanaka Dissertation Award in his memory.

In 1993, the Journal of Personality started to run a series of papers titled The Jeffrey S. Tanaka Occasional Papers in Quantitative Methods for Personality in Tanaka's memory. As of 2011, papers were still being written for the series.

In 1994, the Society of Multivariate Experimental Psychology introduced the Tanaka Award for Best Article in Multivariate Behavioral Research, given annually to the authors of the most outstanding paper in the Multivariate Behavioral Research journal.

== Publications ==
=== Selected academic works ===
The works below are listed by number of times cited (descending), according to data from Google Scholar (correct as of January 2017).

- Tanaka, J. S. (1993). "Multifaceted conceptions of fit in structural equation models". SAGE Focus Editions. 154: 10–39.
- Tanaka, J. S. (February 1987). ""How big is big enough?": sample size and goodness of fit in structural equation models with latent variables". Child Development. 58 (1): 134–146. doi:10.2307/1130296. JSTOR 1130296.
- Malamuth, N. M.; Sockloskie, R. J.; Koss, M. P.; Tanaka, J. S. (October 1991). "Characteristics of aggressors against women: Testing a model using a national sample of college students". Journal of Consulting and Clinical Psychology. 59 (5): 670–681. doi:10.1037/0022-006X.59.5.670. PMID 1955602.
- Tanaka, J. S.; Huba, G. J. (November 1985). "A fit index for covariance structure models under arbitrary GLS estimation". British Journal of Mathematical and Statistical Psychology. 38 (2): 197–201. doi:10.1111/j.2044-8317.1985.tb00834.x.
- Tanaka, J. S.; Huba, G. J. (March 1984). "Confirmatory hierarchical factor analyses of psychological distress measures". Journal of Personality and Social Psychology. 46 (3): 621–635. doi:10.1037/0022-3514.46.3.621.
- Tanaka, J. S.; Huba, G. J. (November 1989). "A general coefficient of determination for covariance structure models under arbitrary GLS estimation". British Journal of Mathematical and Statistical Psychology. 42 (2): 233–239. doi:10.1111/j.2044-8317.1989.tb00912.x.
- la Du, T. J.; Tanaka, J. S. (August 1989). "Influence of sample size, estimation method, and model specification on goodness-of-fit assessments in structural equation models". Journal of Applied Psychology. 74 (4): 625–635. doi:10.1037/0021-9010.74.4.625.
- Lebovits, A. H.; Strain, J. J.; Schleifer, S. J.; Tanaka, J. S.; Bhardwaj, S.; Messe, M. R. (1990). "Patient noncompliance with self-administered chemotherapy". Cancer. 65 (1): 17–22. doi:10.1002/1097-0142(19900101)65:1<17::AID-CNCR2820650106>3.0.CO;2-I. PMID 2293862. S2CID 2828861.
