= Alston Scott Householder =

American mathematician (1904–1993)

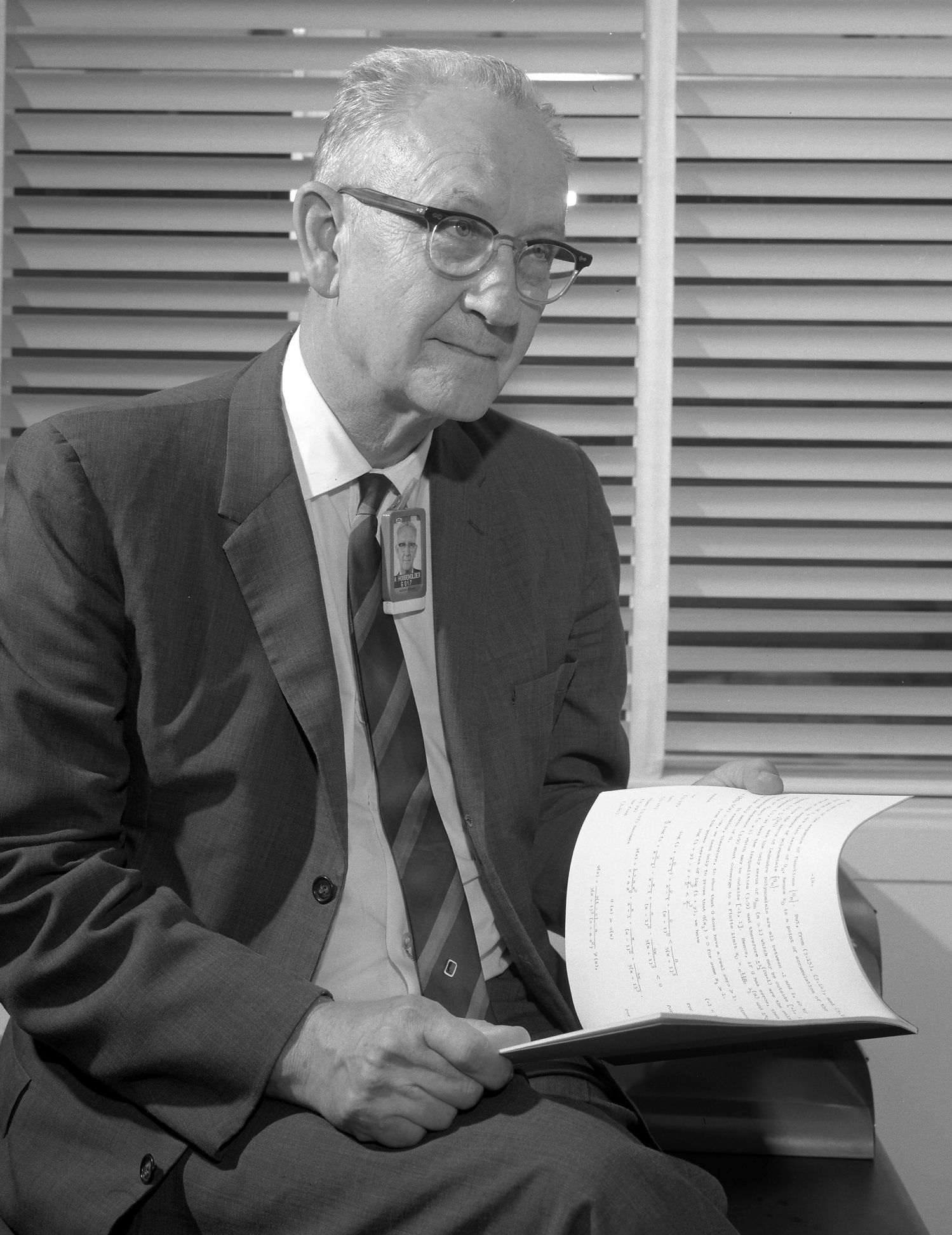
- Householder in May 1969
- Born: May 5, 1904; Rockford, Illinois, U.S.
- Died: July 4, 1993 (aged 89); Malibu, California, U.S.
- Education: Northwestern University (BA); Cornell University (MA); University of Chicago (PhD)
- Known for: Householder operator; Householder transformation; Householder's method
- Spouses: Belle Householder (died 1975) Heidi Vogg (m. 1984)
- Children: 2
- Scientific career
- Fields: Numerical analysis; mathematical biology; linear algebra
- Institutions: Oak Ridge National Laboratory
- Thesis: The Dependence of a Focal Point Upon Curvature in the Calculus of Variations (1937)
- Doctoral advisor: Gilbert Ames Bliss

Alston Scott Householder (May 5, 1904 – July 4, 1993) was an American mathematician who specialized in mathematical biology and numerical analysis. He discovered Householder transformations and is the namesake of Householder's method.

== Life and career ==
Alston Scott Householder was born on May 5, 1904, in Rockford, Illinois. He received a BA in philosophy from Northwestern University in 1925 and an MA in philosophy from Cornell University in 1927. He taught mathematics while preparing for his PhD, which was awarded at the University of Chicago in 1937. His thesis dealt with the topic of the calculus of variations.

After receiving his doctorate, Householder concentrated on the field of mathematical biology, working with several other researchers with Nicolas Rashevsky at the University of Chicago. During this time, he worked on mathematical theory of biological neural networks. In 1941, he published an abstract model of neural networks that uses what would now be called the ReLU activation function. His work influenced Warren McCulloch and Walter Pitts's seminal 1943 paper "A Logical Calculus of the Ideas Immanent in Nervous Activity."

In 1946, Householder joined the Mathematics Division of the Oak Ridge National Laboratory, where he was appointed chair in 1948. It is during this period that his interests shift toward numerical analysis. In 1969, he left ORNL to become Professor of Mathematics at the University of Tennessee, where he eventually became chairman. In 1974, he retired and went to live in Malibu, California.

Householder contributed in different ways to the organisation of research. He was president of the Society for Industrial and Applied Mathematics (SIAM) and of the Association for Computing Machinery (ACM). He was a member of the redactional committees for Psychometrika, Numerische Mathematik, Linear Algebra and Its Applications, and was editor in chief of the SIAM Journal on Numerical Analysis. He opened up his wide personal bibliography on numerical linear algebra in form of a KWIC index. He also organized the important Gatlinburg Conferences, which are still held under the name Householder Symposia.

== Personal life ==
Householder spent his youth in Alabama. He was first married to Belle Householder (died 1975), with whom he had two children, John and Jackie, and remarried in 1984 to Heidi Householder (née Vogg). He died in Malibu, California, on July 4, 1993.

== Selected works ==
- Young, Gale; —— (1938). "Discussion of a Set of Points in Terms of their Mutual Distances". Psychometrika. 3 (1): 19–22. doi:10.1007/BF02287916. pioneer paper in multidimensional scaling (See also, M.W. Richardson)
- —— (June 1941). "A theory of steady-state activity in nerve-fiber networks: I. Definitions and preliminary lemmas". The Bulletin of Mathematical Biophysics. 3 (2): 63–69. doi:10.1007/BF02478220. ISSN 0007-4985.
- —— (1956). "Bibliography on Numerical Analysis". Journal of the ACM. 3 (2): 85–100. doi:10.1145/320825.320829.
- —— (1964). The Theory of Matrices in Numerical Analysis. New York: Blaisdell Publishing Company.
- —— (1970). The Numerical Treatment of a Single Nonlinear Equation. New York: McGraw‑Hill. ISBN 9780070304659.
