= Linda Collins (psychologist) =

American quantitative psychologist

Linda M. Collins is an American quantitative psychologist who is a professor of global public health at New York University.

== Life ==
Collins earned a B.A. in psychology at the University of Connecticut. She received a Ph.D. in quantitative psychology from the University of Southern California.

Collins was a tenured faculty member at the University of Southern California. She was a distinguished professor of human development and family studies at Pennsylvania State University. At New York University, she is a professor of global public health in the department of social and behavioral sciences.

Collins is an elected fellow of the American Psychological Association, Association for Psychological Science, and the Society of Behavioral Medicine. She served as president of the Society of Multivariate Experimental Psychology and the Society for Prevention Research.

== Research and contributions ==
Dr. Collins is known for her work on the Multiphase Optimization Strategy (MOST), which integrates concepts from engineering, behavioral science, multivariate statistics, health economics, and decision analysis. MOST aims to enhance intervention effectiveness, affordability, scalability, and efficiency. She has applied MOST in diverse areas, including HIV, smoking cessation, prevention of excessive alcohol use in college students, and weight loss.

Her research has received funding from institutions such as the National Institute on Drug Abuse (NIDA), the National Institute on Alcohol Abuse and Alcoholism (NIAAA), the National Cancer Institute (NCI), the National Institute of Diabetes and Digestive and Kidney Diseases (NIDDK), and the National Science Foundation (NSF).

Collins has published extensively in journals across behavioral sciences, quantitative methodology, medicine, and engineering. She has given over 150 invited presentations on MOST worldwide. Collaborating with Dr. Kate Guastaferro, she developed two massive open online courses on intervention optimization and MOST.
