= HOX =

Hox or HOX may refer to:

- Hox gene
- Hoxton railway station, in London
- Joop Hox (born 1949), Dutch psychologist
- House of X and Powers of X
