= Van der Zouwen =

Van der Zouwen is a Dutch surname. Notable people with the surname include:

- Arie van der Zouwen, Dutch footballer and manager
- Hans van der Zouwen (born 1939), Dutch sociologist
- Kraantje Pappie, stage name of Alex van der Zouwen, Dutch rapper
