= Jacob Cohen (statistician) =

American statistician and psychologist

- Born: April 20, 1923; New York City, US
- Died: January 20, 1998 (aged 74); New York City, US
- Education: City College of New York; New York University
- Known for: Cohen's kappa, Cohen's d, and Cohen's h
- Scientific career
- Fields: Psychology; Statistics
- Institutions: Montrose VA Medical Center; New York University
- Thesis: A comparative analysis of the factors underlying intelligence test performance of different neuropsychiatric groups (1950)
- Doctoral advisor: Avrum Ben-Avi

Jacob Cohen (April 20, 1923 – January 20, 1998) was an American psychologist and statistician best known for his work on statistical power and effect size, which helped to lay foundations for current statistical meta-analysis and the methods of estimation statistics. He gave his name to such measures as Cohen's kappa, Cohen's d, and Cohen's h.

== Education and career ==
Cohen grew up in a Yiddish-speaking household and learned English at school. He attended the Townsend Harris High School and graduated at the age of 15. He entered the City College of New York, where he first studied mathematics but was interrupted by a service in the US Army intelligence during World War II in Europe. He eventually received a BA in psychology in 1947 from the City College. He then obtained his Master's degree in 1948 and PhD in clinical psychology at New York University (NYU) in 1950. His PhD advisor was Avrum Ben-Avi. Cohen worked in the hospitals affiliated with the Veterans Administration after graduation, first at Bronx, then at Montrose VA Medical Center, where he was a director of research. Between 1959 and retirement in 1993, he worked in the psychology department at NYU, latterly as the head of the quantitative psychology group. In 1969 Cohen married Patricia Ruth Childs (1936-2018), later Patricia Cohen, who was a former PhD student in psychology at NYU.

After retirement from NYU, Cohen continued working as a statistical consultant at the Columbia Presbyterian Medical Center, New York State Psychiatric Institute, and at their joint H.I.V. Center for Clinical and Behavioral Studies. Cohen passed away in 1998 at the St. Vincent's Hospital and Medical Center in New York City.

Cohen was president of the Society of Multivariate Experimental Psychology in 1969. He was awarded the Distinguished Lifetime Achievement Award by the American Psychological Association in 1997 and was a fellow of the American Association for the Advancement of Science, the American Psychological Association and the American Statistical Association.

== Power analysis and significance testing ==
In addition to being an advocate of power analysis and effect size, Cohen was a critic of reliance on, and lack of understanding of, significance testing procedures used in statistics, especially misunderstandings of null hypothesis significance testing. In particular, he identified the "near universal misinterpretation of p as the probability that H_{0} is false, the misinterpretation that its complement is the probability of successful replication, and the mistaken assumption that if one rejects H_{0} one thereby affirms the theory that led to the test". He encouraged instead a recognition of single studies as exploratory and a reliance on replication for support. Cohen developed known interpretation thresholds for the correlation r and the standardized mean difference d.

== Selected works ==
Below are listed some of Cohen's works. Where multiple authors are present, full names are used to facilitate reader searches for other works by those authors.

- Jacob Cohen (1960), "A coefficient of agreement for nominal scales", Educational and Psychological Measurement, 20 (1): 37–46, doi:10.1177/001316446002000104, hdl:1942/28116, S2CID 15926286
- Jacob Cohen (October 1968), "Weighted kappa: Nominal scale agreement provision for scaled disagreement or partial credit", Psychological Bulletin, 70 (4): 213–220, doi:10.1037/h0026256, PMID 19673146
- Jacob Cohen (1968), "Multiple regression as a general data-analytic system" (PDF), Psychological Bulletin, 70 (6): 426–443, CiteSeerX 10.1.1.476.6180, doi:10.1037/h0026714, archived from the original (PDF) on 11 June 2011
- Jacob Cohen (1988), Statistical Power Analysis for the Behavioral Sciences (2nd ed.), New Jersey: Lawrence Erlbaum Associates, ISBN 978-0-8058-0283-2
- Jacob Cohen (1992), "A power primer" (PDF), Psychological Bulletin, 112 (1): 155–159, doi:10.1037/0033-2909.112.1.155, PMID 19565683, archived from the original (PDF) on 20 July 2011
- Jacob Cohen (June 1992), "Statistical power analysis" (PDF), Current Directions in Psychological Science, 1 (3): 98–101, doi:10.1111/1467-8721.ep10768783, JSTOR 20182143, S2CID 144390805, archived from the original (PDF) on 3 March 2016
- Jacob Cohen (December 1994), "The Earth is round (p < .05)" (PDF), American Psychologist, 49 (12): 997–1003, doi:10.1037/0003-066x.49.12.997, archived from the original (PDF) on 20 January 2012
- Patricia Cohen; Jacob Cohen (1996), Life Values and Adolescent Mental Health, New Jersey: Lawrence Erlbaum Associates, ISBN 978-0-8058-1774-4
- Michael Borenstein; Hannah Rothstein; Jacob Cohen; David Schoenfeld; Jesse Berliln; Edward Lakatos (2001), Power and Precision: A computer program for statistical power analysis and confidence intervals, Englewood, New Jersey: Biostat, Inc, ISBN 978-0-9709662-0-9
- Jacob Cohen; Patricia Cohen; Stephen G. West; Leona S. Aiken (2003), Applied Multiple Regression/Correlation Analysis for the Behavioral Sciences (3rd ed.), New Jersey: Lawrence Erlbaum Associates, ISBN 978-0-8058-2223-6
