= Herman J. Adèr =

Dutch statistician

- Born: May 20, 1940 (age 86)

Academic background
- Education: University of Amsterdam
- Thesis: Methodological Knowledge: Notation and Implementation in Expert Systems (1995)

Academic work
- Discipline: Statistician
- Institutions: Vrije Universiteit; VU University Medical Center; University of Stavanger

Hermanus Johannes "Herman J." Adèr (born May 20, 1940) is a Dutch statistician/methodologist and consultant at the Vrije Universiteit, the VU University Medical Center and the University of Stavanger, known for work on Methodological Modelling and Social Research Methodology.

== Biography ==
Born in Amsterdam, Adèr received his BA in psychology and social science methods, and his MA in numerical mathematics, both from the University of Amsterdam mid-1960s. Later in 1995 there he also received his PhD with a thesis entitled "Methodological knowledge : notation and implementation in expert systems."

After some years teaching mathematics, he returned to the academia in 1971, where he was faculty member at the Faculty of Psychology of the Vrije Universiteit. In 1993, he moved to the VU University Medical Center, where he was associate professor at the Department of Clinical Epidemiology and Biostatistics until 2005.

Since the 1980s, Adèr as researcher and consultant affiliated with the Centrum Wiskunde & Informatica in Amsterdam. Since 2006, he is advisor at the Reading Center of the University of Stavanger. Since 2008, he is also director of Johannes van Kessel Publishing. And from 2008 to 2012, he was consultant at the Trimbos Institute for Social Science Research in Utrecht.

== Publications ==
Adèr has authored and co-authored numerous publications in his field of expertise.

- 1995. Methodological knowledge : notation and implementation in expert systems. Thesis University of Amsterdam.
- 1999. Research Methodology in the Social, Behavioural and Life Sciences. Herman J. Adèr and Gideon J. Mellenbergh (Eds.) London: Sage.
- 2003. RM 2003 : proceedings of the second workshop on research methodology, June 25–27, 2003, VU University, Amsterdam. Herman J. Adèr and Gideon J. Mellenbergh (Eds.)
- 2008 Advising on Research Methods: A consultant's companion. Herman J. Adèr, Gideon J. Mellenbergh with contributions by David J. Hand. Huizen, The Netherlands: van Kessel. p. 244.

Articles, a selection:

- Flier, H. van der, Mellenbergh, G.J., Ader, H.J. & Wijn, M. (1984) "The iterative item bias selection method." Journal of Educational Measurement, 21, 131–145.
- Barkhof, Frederik, et al. "Comparison of MRI criteria at first presentation to predict conversion to clinically definite multiple sclerosis." Brain 120.11 (1997): 2059–2069.
- Geerlings, M. I., Jonker, C., Bouter, L. M., Adèr, H. J., & Schmand, B. (1999). Association between memory complaints and incident Alzheimer's disease in elderly people with normal baseline cognition. American Journal of Psychiatry, 156(4), 531–537.
- Bleiker, E., Pouwer, F., van der Ploeg, H. M., Leer, J. W. H., & Adèr, H. J. (2000). Psychological distress two years after diagnosis of breast cancer: frequency and prediction. Patient Education and Counseling, 40(3), 209–217.
