= Vaida D. Thompson =

Population psychologist

- Citizenship: American
- Education: Florida State University, University of North Carolina at Chapel Hill
- Occupation: Professor at the university of north carolina at chapel hill
- Awards: Newman-Proshansky Career Achievement Award
- Scientific career
- Fields: Population psychology, Social psychology
- Workplaces: University of North Carolina at Chapel Hill
- Thesis: (1968)
- Doctoral students: Joseph Lee Rodgers

Vaida D. Thompson is a population psychologist who was instrumental in establishing the American Psychological Association's Division 34, Population and Environmental Psychology (now known as the Society of Environmental, Population, and Conservation Psychology). She served as the first president of APA Division 34 from 1973 to 1975.

Thompson was the founding Editor-in-Chief of the journal Population and Environment (1977–1984). In 2013, she received the Newman-Proshansky Career Achievement Award in recognition of her significant contributions to the field of population psychology.

Prior to her retirement, Thompson was Professor of Psychology at The University of North Carolina at Chapel Hill and Director of their Social Psychology Program.

== Biography ==
Thompson attended Florida State University where she received a B.S.N Ed. in Nursing Education in 1958 and a M.A. in psychology in 1959. She worked as a research assistant at Duke University Medical Center and at the Institute for Research in Social Science of the University of North Carolina at Chapel Hill, where she completed her PhD in psychology in 1968. Thompson joined the faculty of the University of North Carolina at Chapel Hill in 1968 and remained there until her retirement in 2006.

Thompson served on the UNC-CH AIDS task-force educating healthcare providers and training domestic/international HIV/AIDS units. Thompson was a member of the editorial board of Advances in Population: Psychosocial Perspectives.

== Research ==
Thompson and her colleagues conducted research on sexual behavior and self-esteem, examining how physical attractiveness, similarity of attitude, and sex may affect platonic and romantic relationships. Her research group also studied family size and birth order in relation to parent-teen relationships and power dynamics, and associations between family size and the self-esteem and psychological wellbeing of teenagers in the family.

Thompson's research addressed social-psychological factors that contribute to protection from HIV infection. She and her colleagues conducted research with Black college students to find out what precautions they took against HIV/AIDS. Thompson and her collaborators investigated Black–White differences in self-esteem across young adulthood, specifically how individuals of different races view themselves and conceptions of controlling their own lives in early adulthood.

In collaboration with A. Tashakkori, Thompson investigated Iranian adolescents’ attitudes towards modernity, including changes in attitudes related to education, career, marriage, fertility, and female labor-force participation. Other collaborative research examined influences of out-group rejection processes in relation to overt signs of homophobia.

== Books ==
- Newman, S. H., & Thompson, V. D. (Eds.). (1976). Population psychology: Research and educational issues. US Department of Health, Education, and Welfare, Public Health Service, National Institutes of Health, National Institute of Child Health and Human Development, Center for Population Research.

== Representative publications ==
- Thompson, V. D. (1974). Family size: Implicit policies and assumed psychological outcomes. Journal of Social Issues, 30(4), 93–124.
- Thompson, V. D., & David, H. P. (1977). Population psychology in perspective. International Journal of Psychology, 12(2), 135–146.
- Thompson, V. D., Lakin, M., & Johnson, B. S. (1965). Sensitivity training and nursing education: A process study. Nursing Research, 14(2), 132–137.
- Thompson, V. D., Stroebe, W., & Schopler, J. (1971). Some situational determinants of the motives attributed to the person who performs a helping act. Journal of Personality, 39(3), 460–472.
- Thompson, V. D., & Tashakkori, A. (1988). Effects of family configuration variables on reported indices of parental power among Iranian adolescents. Social Biology, 35(1–2), 82–90.
