= Cohen's h =

Measure of distance between two proportions

In statistics, Cohen's h, popularized by Jacob Cohen, is a measure of distance between two proportions or probabilities. Cohen's h has several related uses:

- It can be used to describe the difference between two proportions as "small", "medium", or "large".
- It can be used to determine if the difference between two proportions is "meaningful".
- It can be used in calculating the sample size for a future study.

When measuring differences between proportions, Cohen's h can be used in conjunction with hypothesis testing. A "statistically significant" difference between two proportions is understood to mean that, given the data, it is likely that there is a difference in the population proportions. However, this difference might be too small to be meaningful—the statistically significant result does not tell us the size of the difference. Cohen's h, on the other hand, quantifies the size of the difference, allowing us to decide if the difference is meaningful.

== Uses ==
Researchers have used Cohen's h as follows.

- Describe the differences in proportions using the rule of thumb criteria set out by Cohen. Namely, h = 0.2 is a "small" difference, h = 0.5 is a "medium" difference, and h = 0.8 is a "large" difference.
- Only discuss differences that have h greater than some threshold value, such as 0.2.
- When the sample size is so large that many differences are likely to be statistically significant, Cohen's h identifies "meaningful", "clinically meaningful", or "practically significant" differences.

== Calculation ==
Given a probability or proportion p, between 0 and 1, its arcsine transformation is

$$\varphi = 2 \arcsin \sqrt{p}.$$

Given two proportions, $p_1$ and $p_2$, h is defined as the difference between their arcsine transformations. Namely,

$$h = \varphi_1 - \varphi_2.$$

This is also sometimes called "directional h" because, in addition to showing the magnitude of the difference, it shows which of the two proportions is greater.

Often, researchers mean "nondirectional h", which is just the absolute value of the directional h:

$$h = \left| \varphi_1 - \varphi_2 \right|.$$

In R, Cohen's h can be calculated using the ES.h function in the pwr package or the cohenH function in the rcompanion package.

== Interpretation ==
Cohen provides the following descriptive interpretations of h as a rule of thumb:

- h = 0.20: "small effect size".
- h = 0.50: "medium effect size".
- h = 0.80: "large effect size".

Cohen cautions that:

As before, the reader is counseled to avoid the use of these conventions, if he can, in favor of exact values provided by theory or experience in the specific area in which he is working.

Nevertheless, many researchers do use these conventions as given.

== See also ==
- Estimation statistics
- Clinical significance
- Cohen's d
- Cohen's g
- Odds ratio
- Effect size
- Sample size determination
