= Gregory R. Hancock =

Gregory Robert Hancock (born April 18, 1963 in Seattle, Washington, USA) is a Professor of Measurement, Statistics and Evaluation. He is the current University of Maryland head of the Educational Department of Measurement and Statistics (EDMS) program. Hancock also co-hosts the podcast Quantitude, which focuses on quantitative methodology, with fellow statistician Patrick J. Curran.
