= Denny Borsboom =

Dutch psychologist and psychometrician

- Born: November 9, 1973 (age 52); The Hague
- Education: University of Amsterdam
- Awards: 2014 Samuel J. Messick Award from the Educational Testing Service and the International Language Testing Association
- Scientific career
- Fields: Psychometrics
- Institutions: University of Amsterdam
- Thesis: Conceptual issues in psychological measurement (2003)
- Doctoral advisor: Gideon J. Mellenbergh, Jaap van Heerden

Denny Borsboom (born November 9, 1973) is a Dutch psychologist and psychometrician. He has been a professor of psychology at the University of Amsterdam since 2013. His work has included applying network theory to the study of mental disorders and their symptoms. In 2018 he presented the Paul B. Baltes Lecture at the Berlin-Brandenburg Academy of Sciences and Humanities. He was the President of the Psychometric Society between 2024 and 2025.

== Books ==
- Measuring the Mind (Cambridge University Press, 2005).
