= Marion Webster Richardson =

American educational psychologist and psychometrician (1896–1965)

Marion Webster Richardson (1896–1965) was an American educational psychologist and psychometrician. He was a founder of the Psychometric Society and a founder and editor of Psychometrika. He was a co-developer of the Kuder–Richardson Formula 20.

One of his most remarkable contributions was the introduction of the technique of multidimensional scaling. His contribution is twofold: he applied the method for the first time—he applied scaling to similarities of colors obtaining a two dimensional representation— and, additionally, he motivated the first algorithm to the problem, the seminal paper of Young and Householder. Sadly, his original paper was a conference proceeding from which only the abstract remains.
