= Barbara M. Byrne =

Canadian Psychologist

- Born: February 21, 1935
- Died: December 19, 2020 (Age 85)
- Citizenship: Canada
- Occupations: Professor Emerita, School of Psychology
- Spouse: Alexander Byrne

Academic background
- Education: University of Ottawa

Barbara M. Byrne (February 21, 1935 - December 19, 2020) was a Canadian quantitative psychologist known for her work in psychometrics, specifically regarding construct validity, structural equation modeling (SEM), and statistics. She held the position of Professor Emerita in the School of Psychology at the University of Ottawa and was a fellow of the International Testing Committee (ITC), International Association for Applied Psychology (IAAP), and American Psychological Association (APA) throughout her research career.

== Biography ==
Byrne received her bachelor's degree from University of Western Ontario, and subsequently taught at multiple Canadian high schools in Western Ontario and Ottawa. She went on to receive her M.A. in Sociology from Carleton University in 1972 and her Ph.D. in Psychometrics and Statistics from University of Ottawa in 1982. At University of Ottawa, she worked under James E. Carlson, culminating in her thesis titled "A Causal Modeling Approach to Construct Validation of Self-Concept Using a Structural Equation Model."

After receiving her doctoral degree, Byrne worked with Richard Shavelson at UCLA as a post-doctoral fellow until she returned as faculty of at University of Ottawa, where she was eventually granted the title of professor emeritus. As professor emeritus, she moved with her husband to Punta Gorda, Florida, but was still flown back by University of Ottawa to continue teaching and lecturing.

Byrne published with Shavelson, Barry Howard Schneider, and Herb Marsh early in her career, focusing on developmental psychology with regard to education and validation studies of various assessments thereof. Byrne was recognized as a fellow of multiple agencies throughout her career by the APA, IAAP, ITC, and was granted multiple awards for her distinguished contributions to teaching, education, testing, assessment, and statistical methodology by the Canadian Psychological Association, APA, ITC, and Society of Multivariate Experimental Psychology (SMEP). The SMEP valued her as an outstanding member by granting her an award created and named in her honor postmortem.

== Research ==
Byrne's main body of work focused on SEM and construct validity within the fields of developmental and social psychology. She published nine books, six of which focus on SEM using various softwares, leading to her award from the SMEP, and the other three focusing on more substantive investigations of society, social psychology, and the health sector.

For a large portion of her career, Byrne studied the Beck Depression Inventory (BDI), running various validation, structural, and equivalence studies on the measure from 1990 until 2007. Specifically, she looked at the validity of the BDI in foreign languages and when applied to foreign populations, such as when used in Bulgaria, Sweden, France, and Hong Kong. She also looked at validity and invariance across subgroups like gender and when the measure was applied to adolescents.

Much of her later and most cited work was spent writing both chapters and books on SEM. Her books are some of the best selling books within the field of multivariate applications, and are primarily instructional materials for conducting SEM within various statistical softwares, including Mplus, Amos, EQS, and LISREL. She also authored "Measuring Self-Concept Across the Life Span: Issues and Instrumentation," a reference book that compiled a wide variety of models and measures of self-concept and provided summary information and empirical support for these self-concept definitions.

== Selected publications ==
=== Books ===
- Byrne, B. M. (1995). Men in groups: Insights, interventions, and psychoeducation. (M. P. Andronico, Ed.). American Psychological Association. ISBN 978-1-55798-326-8.
- Byrne, B. M. (1996). Measuring self-concept across the life span: Issues and instrumentation. American Psychological Association. ISBN 978-1-55798-332-9.
- Byrne, B. M. (1998). Structural equation modeling with EQS and EQS/Windows: Basic concepts, applications, and programming (2nd ed.). Sage. ISBN 9780803950917
- Byrne, B. M. (2010). Structural equation modeling with Amos: Basic Concepts, applications, and programming (3rd ed., Ser. Multivariate Applications Series). Routledge. ISBN 9781315757421
- Byrne, B. M. (2012). A primer of LISREL: Basic applications and programming for confirmatory factor analytic models. Springer. doi:10.1007/978-1-4613-8885-2
- Byrne, B. M. (2012). Structural equation modeling with Mplus: Basic concepts, applications, and programming (Ser. Multivariate Applications Series). Routledge. ISBN 978-0-203-80764-4
- Byrne, B. M. (2013). Structural equation modeling with EQS: Basic concepts, applications, and programming (2nd ed., Ser. Multivariate Applications Series). Routledge.
- Byrne, B. M. (2014). Structural equation modeling with LISREL, PRELIS, and SIMPLIS: Basic concepts, applications, and programming (Ser. Multivariate Applications Series). Psychology Press. ISBN 978-1-134-80934-9.

== Articles ==
- Byrne, B. M. (2002). Validating the measurement and structure of self-concept: Snapshots of past, present, and future research. American Psychologist, 57(11), 897-909. doi:10.1037/0003-066x.57.11.897.
- Byrne, B. M. (2005). Factor analytic models: Viewing the structure of an assessment instrument from three perspectives. Journal of Personality Assessment, 85(1), 17-30. doi:10.1207/s15327752jpa8501_02.
- Byrne, B. M., Baron, P., & Campbell, T. L. (1993). Measuring adolescent depression: Factorial validity and invariance of the Beck Depression Inventory across gender. Journal of Research on Adolescence, 3(2), 127-143. doi:10.1207/s15327795jra0302_2.
- Byrne, B. M., Stewart, S. M., & Kennard, B. D. (2007). The Beck Depression Inventory-II: Testing for measurement equivalence and factor mean differences across hong kong and american adolescents. International Journal of Testing, 7(3), 293-309. doi:10.1080/15305050701438058.
- Byrne, B. M., Lam, W. W. T., & Fielding, R. (2008). Measuring patterns of change in personality assessments: An annotated application of latent growth curve modeling. Journal of Personality Assessment, 90(6), 536-546. doi:10.1080/00223890802388350.
