= Mark Appelbaum =

American psychologist (1941–2020)

Mark I. Appelbaum
- Born: December 17, 1941; Canton, Ohio, U.S.
- Died: December 21, 2020 (aged 79); San Diego, California, U.S.
- Education: Carnegie Mellon University; University of Illinois Urbana-Champaign
- Scientific career
- Fields: Quantitative psychology, developmental methodology
- Workplaces: University of North Carolina at Chapel Hill; Vanderbilt University; University of California, San Diego

Mark I. Appelbaum (December 17, 1941 – December 21, 2020) was an American quantitative psychologist and developmental methodologist known for advancing longitudinal research methods.

== Career ==
He held faculty positions at the University of North Carolina at Chapel Hill, Vanderbilt University, and the University of California, San Diego. Appelbaum contributed to major developmental research projects, including the Abecedarian Project and the NICHD Study of Early Child Care, and served as editor of Psychological Bulletin and founding editor of Psychological Methods. He also founded Vanderbilt University's Quantitative Methods Program. He was actively involved in the Publication Manual of the American Psychological Association.

== Death ==
Appelbaum died from COVID-19 in San Diego on December 21, 2020, at the age of 79.
