= Felix Geyer =

Dutch sociologist and cybernetician (1933–2020)

Rudolf Felix Geyer (October 13, 1933 – August 23, 2020) was a Dutch sociologist and cybernetician, former head of the methodology section of SISWO (Interuniversity Institute for Social Science Research) at the University of Amsterdam, known for his work in the fields of Social alienation, and on sociocybernetics.

== Biography ==
Born in Amsterdam, Geyer began studies in geology at the University of Amsterdam in 1951 and received his BA in 1953. He continued with studies in sociology and received his MA at the University of Amsterdam in 1961. Later in 1980 he received his PhD under Hiddo M. Jolles with a thesis, entitled "Alienation theories : a general systems approach".

In the 1960s Geyer started working in industry, where he worked in the fields of marketing and labor market research. In 1968 he joined the Interuniversity Institute for Social Science Research (SISWO) at the University of Amsterdam, where he became head of the methodology section. He held this position until his retirement in 1998. In 1970 Geyer was one of the co-founders of the Dutch Systems Group, and served on its board.

Geyer died on August 23, 2020, at the age of 86.

== Selected publications ==
- Geyer, R. Felix. Alienation Theories: A general systems approach. Pergamon Press, 1980.
- Geyer, Felix, and Johannes van der Zouwen, eds. Sociocybernetic Paradoxes: observation, control and evolution of self-steering systems. Sage, 1986.
- Geyer, R. Felix. Alienation, ethnicity, and postmodernism. No. 116. Praeger, 1996.
- Geyer, R. Felix, and David R. Schweitzer, eds. Alienation, problems of meaning, theory, and method. Routledge/Thoemms Press, 1981.
- Geyer, R. Felix, and Johannes van der Zouwen, eds. Sociocybernetics: Complexity, autopoiesis, and observation of social systems. No. 132. Greenwood Publishing Group, 2001.

Articles a selection

- Felix Geyer and Johannes van der Zouwen. "Sociocybernetics" in: Handbook of Cybernetics (C.V. Negoita, ed.). New York: Marcel Dekker, 1992, pp. 95–124.
- Felix Geyer. "The Challenge of Sociocybernetics". In: Kybernetes. 24(4):6-32, 1995. Copyright MCB University Press1995
- Felix Geyer. "Sociocybernetics" In: Kybernetes, Vol. 31 No. 7/8, 2002, pp. 1021–1042.
