= Dorien DeTombe =

Dutch sociologist

Dorothea Jacqueline (Dorien) DeTombe (born 1947) is a Dutch sociologist and former academic at the Utrecht University and the Delft University of Technology, known for her contributions in the field of methodology for societal complexity.

== Biography ==
DeTombe studied social science and computer science at the Utrecht University. She received her doctorate in 1994 in the field of methodology for Societal Complexity on the COMPRAM Methodology under supervision of Harm 't Hart with the thesis, entitled "Defining complex interdisciplinary societal problems : a theoretical study for constructing a co-operative problem analyzing method: the method COMPRAM".

DeTombe started her academic career at the Radboud University Nijmegen, and spent her main career as a scientist at Utrecht University and at Delft University of Technology at its School for Systems Engineering, Policy Analysis and Management, and as a visiting professor abroad. She gives lectures on the subject of Methodology of Societal Complexity as visiting professor and at conferences all over the world.

DeTombe has organized yearly conferences on the topic of Methodology of Societal Complexity. She built a multidisciplinary International Research Group on Societal Complexity in Europe, North America, and Africa. She has been president of the International Research Society on Methodology of Societal Complexity.

== Work ==
DeTombe research interests concern the subject of how to handle complex problems in the area of Global safety. She has published over 100 articles and many books, some of them together with her colleagues Cor van Dijkum and Elmar Stuhler.

DeTombe developed the methodology COMPRAM (Complex Problem Handling Methodology), a multi disciplined methodology for political decision making on complex societal issues like sustainable development, floods, hurricanes, large city problems, terrorism, HIV/AIDS, Sars and water affairs and economic problems like the credit crisis. The COMPRAM methodology is advised by the OECD (July 2006) to handle Global Safety.

== Selected publications ==
- DeTombe, Dorien (1994). Defining complex interdisciplinary societal problems. A theoretical study for constructing a co-operative problem analyzing methodology: the methodology COMPRAM. Amsterdam: Thesis publishers Amsterdam (thesis). ISBN 90-5170-302-3.
- DeTombe, Dorien J; van Dijkum, Cor, eds. (1996). Analyzing Societal Problems. A Methodological Approach. Mering: Rainer Hampp Verlag. ISBN 3-87988-189-8.
- DeTombe, D.J.; Stuhler, E., eds. (1999). Complex Problem Solving; Methodological Support for Societal Policy Making. Research on Cases and Theories. Vol. 6. Munchen/Mering: Hampp Verlag. ISBN 3-87988-356-4.
- DeTombe, Dorien (2003). "Handling Complex Societal Problems (Applied on the Aids/HIV Problem)". In Becker, Henk; Vanclay, Frank (eds.). International Handbook of Social Impact Assessment Conceptual and Methodological Advances. Edward Elgar Publishers. pp. 296–315. ISBN 1-84064-935-6.

Articles, a selection:

- DeTombe, Dorien J (January 16, 2001). DeTombe (ed.). "Compram, a Method for Handling Complex Societal Problems". European Journal of Operational Research. 128 (2): 266–282. doi:10.1016/s0377-2217(00)00070-9.
- DeTombe, Dorien J. "Complex societal problems in operational research." European Journal of Operational Research 140.2 (2002): 232–240.
