= Fred Oswald =

American Academic

Academic background
- Education: University of Minnesota

Academic work
- Discipline: Industrial organizational psychology
- Sub-discipline: AI ethics, meta-science, research methods
- Institutions: University of California, Irvine, Rice University

Fred Oswald is an American industrial organizational psychologist who is known for his contributions to artificial intelligence ethics, psychometrics, workforce readiness, and the measurement of individual differences in organizational settings. He is currently a professor at the University of California, Irvine School of Education. Until January, 2026, he was the Herbert S. Autrey Professor of Social Sciences at Rice University in Houston, Texas. He is a national associate of the National Academies of Sciences, Engineering, and Medicine, a fellow of the Society for Industrial and Organizational Psychology, and the Association for Psychological Science. He currently serves as the editor of the journal Psychological Methods. In 2021, Oswald was appointed to the U.S. Department of Commerce's Artificial Intelligence Consortium.
