= Cor van Dijkum =

Dutch sociologist, consultant and academic

Cornelis Johannes "Cor" van Dijkum (born 1950) is a Dutch sociologist, consultant and academic at the Utrecht University, known for his contributions in the field of methodology for complex societal problems.

== Biography ==
Van Dijkum obtained his MSc in Physics from the University of Amsterdam in the 1970s, and in 1988 his PhD in Social Sciences from the Utrecht University with the thesis entitled "Paradoxen : een methodologische studie naar vicieuze cirkels in denken en handelen" (Paradoxes: a methodological study to vicious circles of thought and action).

After his graduation Van Dijkum had started his academic career at the Utrecht University, where he became professor at the Department of Methodology and Statistics. He has been director of the NOSMO (Dutch Organization for Methodological Research in the Social Sciences) for about a decades. In 2000 he also founded Sokrates Consultancy and Engineering. Van Dijkum was also Editor-in-Chief of the International Scientific Journal of Methods and Models of Complexity journal.

Van Dijkum's research interests are in the field of "nonlinear modeling, computer simulation, methodology, epistemology of science, and action research health care."

== Work ==
=== NOSMO ===
The Dutch Organization for Methodological Research in the Social Sciences (NOSMO) started in the early 1980s as Stichting Nederlandse Organisatie voor Sociaal-Wetenschappelijk Methodologisch Onderzoek (NOSMO). Their initial focus was on qualitative research. Over the years working groups were created around the following subjects:

- Data collection, Instrumentation & Research design
- Qualitative Research (formerly SIM)
- Longitudinal Models
- Nosmo Methodology of Societal Complexity
- Simulation & Game
- Social Network Analysis, and
- Sociocybernetics

Notable academics who cooperated in NOSMO beside Van Dijkum were Gerhard van de Bunt, Dorien DeTombe, Stasja Draisma, Frans van Eijnatten, Henk Flap, Joop Hox, Edith de Leeuw, Cora Maas, Gerty Lensvelt-Mulders, Han Oud, Tom Snijders and Fred Wester.

One of the offspring of NOSMO is the KWALON platform for qualitative research, and the journals Journal for the improvement of methodology in applied research and International Scientific Journal of Methods and Models of Complexity.

=== Complexity science ===
In his 2013 speech on the EURO Mini-Conference Graz 2013, entitled "Complexity is more than complicated," Van Dijkum stipulated that:

... social scientists realized in the last decennia, inspired by colleagues in the natural sciences, that many phenomena in the social world can be viewed as complex social systems.

And furthermore:

Through systems theory one recognizes that events are interrelated, interact with each other and make up systems. With dynamic systems theory one understand that social systems evolve in time, moved by cause-effect relations between events that can be described mathematically in differential equations."

Van Dijkum believed that "with the idea of ‘complex social systems’ one comprehend that those differential equations are non linear, reflecting systems that are difficult to follow and predict, just as many phenomena in the world. It is the start of a promising program of research in the social sciences including system dynamics."

== Selected publications ==
- Dijkum C. van, Zeeuw G. de & Glanville R. (1998) (Eds.). Methodological Explorations in Constructivism. Southsea and Amsterdam: BKSplus.
- Dijkum C. van, DeTombe D., Kuijk E.. (1998) (Eds.) . Validation of Simulation Models. Amsterdam: Siswo.
- C. van Dijkum, J. Blasius, H. Kleijer, B. van Hilten (Eds.), Recent Developments and Applications in Social Research Methodology. SISWO, Amsterdam, 2004.
- Baarda, Dirk Benjamin, Martijn PM de Goede, and Cor van Dijkum. Introduction to Statistics with SPSS: A Guide to the Processing, Analysing and Reporting of (research) Data. Wolters-Noordhoff, 2004.

Articles, a selection:

- Schroots, Johannes JF, Cor Van Dijkum, and Marian HJ Assink. "Autobiographical memory from a life span perspective." The International Journal of Aging and Human Development 58.1 (2004): 69-85.
- Hoksbergen, R., ter Laak, J., Rijk, K., van Dijkum, C., & Stoutjesdijk, F. (2005). "Post-institutional autistic syndrome in Romanian adoptees." Journal of Autism and Developmental Disorders, 35(5), 615-623.
- Landsheer, Johannes A., and Cor van Dijkum. "Male and female delinquency trajectories from pre through middle adolescence and their continuation in late adolescence." Adolescence 40.160 (2005): 729.
