= Population and Environment =

- Discipline: Environmental and social sciences
- Language: English
- Edited by: Elizabeth Fussell

Publication details
- Former name: Journal of Population
- History: 1978-present
- Publisher: Springer Science+Business Media
- Frequency: Quarterly
- Impact factor: 4.283 (2021)

Standard abbreviations
- ISO 4: Popul. Environ.

Indexing
- CODEN: PENVDK
- ISSN: 0199-0039 (print); 1573-7810 (web)
- LCCN: 80648697
- JSTOR: 15737810
- OCLC no.: 05511021

Links
- Journal homepage; Online archive

Population and Environment is a quarterly peer-reviewed academic journal covering research on the reciprocal links between population, natural resources, and the natural environment. The journal was established in 1978 as the Journal of Population, obtaining its current title in 1980. The editor-in-chief is Brian Thiede (Penn State University). Vaida Thompson was the founding editor-in-chief (1977-1984).

Former editors-in-chief of the journal include Elizabeth Fussell (Brown University), Lori Hunter (University of Colorado Boulder), and Landis MacKellar (Vienna Institute of Demography), Kevin MacDonald (California State University, Long Beach) and Virginia Abernethy (Vanderbilt University). Both Abernethy and MacDonald are prominent white supremacists.

According to the Journal Citation Reports, the journal has a 2021 impact factor of 4.283.

== Past editors ==
The following persons have been editor-in-chief:

- 2007-2017 Lori Hunter (University of Colorado Boulder)
- 2004-2007 Landis MacKellar (Vienna Institute of Demography)
- 1999-2004 Kevin MacDonald (California State University, Long Beach)
- 1988-1999 Virginia Abernethy (Vanderbilt University)
- 1984-1988 Burton Mindick (Cornell University) and Ralph Taylor (Johns Hopkins University)
- 1977-1984 Vaida D. Thompson (University of North Carolina, Chapel Hill)
