= Elizabeth Fussell =

American sociologist

- Education: Bryn Mawr College (BA); University of Wisconsin-Madison (MS, PhD)
- Scientific career
- Fields: Sociology
- Workplaces: Brown University

Elizabeth Fussell is an American sociologist and Professor of Population Studies and Environment and Society at Brown University. Since 2017, she is the editor-in-chief of the academic journal Population and Environment. She has researched population change in response to hurricanes, notably in New Orleans after Hurricane Katrina.

Fussell received her B.A. in sociology with a concentration in Latin American studies from Bryn Mawr College and M.S. and Ph.D. in sociology from the University of Wisconsin-Madison.

She was an assistant professor in the Sociology Department at Tulane University from 2001 to 2007. From 2009 to 2014, she was associate professor in the Sociology Department at Washington State University. Since 2014, she has worked as a professor at Brown University.

== Selected publications ==
- Fussell, Elizabeth. "Constructing New Orleans, Constructing Race: A Population History of New Orleans." The Journal of American History, 94(3), 2007, pp. 846–55. JSTOR, https://doi.org/10.2307/25095147.
- Fussell Elizabeth. "The Long Term Recovery of New Orleans' Population after Hurricane Katrina." The American Behavioral Scientist, 59(10), 2015, pp. 1231–1245. https://doi.org/10.1177/0002764215591181
