= Hans van der Zouwen =

Dutch sociologist

Johannes "Hans" van der Zouwen (born 1939) is a Dutch sociologist, and Emeritus Professor of Social Research Methodology at the Vrije Universiteit in Amsterdam, known for his pioneering work with Felix Geyer in the field of sociocybernetics.

In the 1960s Van der Zouwen received his MA in sociology and 1970 his PhD in sociology from the Vrije Universiteit with a thesis about the sociological aspects of volunteer work around the Vrije Universiteit Amsterdam.

In the late 1960s Van der Zouwen had started his academic career at the Vrije University in Amsterdam. In 1969 he had become chair of the department of Social Research Methodology. From 1971 to early 2000 he was Professor of Social Research Methodology. Since then he is affiliated with the Interuniversity Graduate School of Psychometrics and Sociometrics (IOPS). In the 1990s Van der Zouwen is awarded Honorary Fellow of the World Organisation of Systems and Cybernetics.

== Selected publications ==
- Geyer, Felix, and Johannes van der Zouwen, eds. Sociocybernetic Paradoxes: observation, control and evolution of self-steering systems. Sage, 1986.
- Geyer, R. Felix, and Johannes van der Zouwen, eds. Sociocybernetics: Complexity, autopoiesis, and observation of social systems. No. 132. Greenwood Publishing Group, 2001.
- Maynard, D. W., Houtkoop-Steenstra, H., Schaeffer, N. C., & Van der Zouwen, J. eds. (2002). Standardization and tacit knowledge. Interaction and Practice in the Survey Interview, New York: Wiley Interscience.

Articles, a selection:

- De Leeuw, Edith D., and Johannes Van der Zouwen. "Data quality in telephone and face to face surveys: a comparative meta-analysis." Telephone survey methodology (1988): 283-299.
- Van der Zouwen, Johannes, Wil Dijkstra, and Johannes H. Smit. "Studying Respondent‐Interviewer Interaction: The Relationship Between Interviewing Style, Interviewer Behavior, and Response Behavior." Measurement errors in surveys (1991): 419-437.
- van der Zouwen, Johannes, and Cor van Dijkum. "Towards a methodology for the empirical testing of complex social cybernetic models." Contribution in Sociology 132 (2001): 223-240.
