= Henk van der Flier =

Dutch psychologist

Hendrik (Henk) van der Flier (born 1945) is a Dutch psychologist, and Professor of Work and Organizational Psychology at the Vrije Universiteit Amsterdam and at its Kurt Lewin Institute (KLI), known for his work on comparability of psychological test performances.

== Biography ==
Van der Flier studied Psychology at the Vrije Universiteit, where he received his BA and his MA in the 1960s. Later in 1980 he there also received his PhD in Psychology with the thesis entitled "Vergelijkbaarheid van individuele testprestaties" (Comparability of individual test performance).

After his graduation late 1960s he started working in industry at the Dutch Railways, where he eventually became head of the department of Industrial Psychology. From 1990 he left for the Arbo Management Group, where he was Product Development and Quality manager. In 1998 he returned to the academia, where he was appointed Professor at the Department of Work and Organizational Psychology of the Vrije Universiteit Amsterdam, and chair of the department.

Van der Flier's research interests are in the fields of "Working Conditions, Safety, Personnel Selection, Psychometrics and Cross-Cultural Psychology... [more specifically] in studies concerning the use of selection tests for immigrant groups in the Netherlands (ability tests, personality tests and computerized psychomotor tests)"

== Publications ==
Van der Flier has authored and co-authored numerous publications in his field of expertise. Books, a selection:

- 1980. Vergelijkbaarheid van individuele testprestaties. Thesis Vrije Universiteit Amsterdam. Lisse : Swets en
- 1991. Selectieresearch in de praktijk. H. van der Flier, P.G.W. Jansen, J.N. Zaal (eds.) Amsterdam : Swets & Zeitlinger
- 1993. Werk maken van loopbanen : ontwikkeling en begeleiding. J.G. Boerlijst, H. van der Flier, A.E.M. van Vianen (eds.) Utrecht : Lemma

Articles, a selection:

- Van Der Flier, Henk. "Deviant response patterns and comparability of test scores." Journal of Cross-Cultural Psychology 13.3 (1982): 267-298.
- Flier, H. van der, Mellenbergh, G.J., Ader, H.J. & Wijn, M. (1984) "The iterative item bias selection method." Journal of Educational Measurement, 21, 131-145.
- Hooft, E. A. V., Born, M. P., Taris, T. W., Flier, H. V. D., & Blonk, R. W. (2004). Predictors of job search behavior among employed and unemployed people. Personnel Psychology, 57(1), 25-59.
- Hoogervorst, Jan, Henk van der Flier, and Paul Koopman. "Implicit communication in organisations: The impact of culture, structure and management practices on employee behaviour." Journal of Managerial Psychology 19.3 (2004): 288-311.
