= Jörg Blasius =

German sociologist

Jörg Blasius (born 1957) is a German sociologist, and Professor at the Institute of Political Science and Sociology of the University of Bonn. He became known through his earlier work on correspondence analysis in the social sciences.

== Life and work ==
Born in Hamburg Blasius obtained his degree in sociology. From 1986 to 2001 he was researcher at the University of Cologne at the city's Central Archive for Empirical Social Research. In 2001 he was appointed Professor at the Institute of Political Science and Sociology of the University of Bonn.

His research interests include the methods of empirical social research, the statistics used (in particular correspondence analysis), the urban sociology, lifestyles, media research, environmental sociology and political sociology.

== Selected publications ==
- Greenacre, Michael J., and Jörg Blasius, eds. Correspondence analysis in the social sciences: Recent developments and applications. London: Academic Press, 1994.
- Blasius, Jörg, and Michael Greenacre. Visualization of categorical data. Academic Press, 1998.
- Friedrichs, Jürgen, and Jörg Blasius. Leben in benachteiligten Wohngebieten. Opladen: Leske+ Budrich, 2000.
- Blasius, Jörg. Korrespondenzanalyse. Oldenbourg Verlag, 2001.
- Cor van Dijkum, J. Blasius, H. Kleijer, B. van Hilten (Eds.), Recent Developments and Applications in Social Research Methodology. SISWO, Amsterdam, 2004.
- Blasius, Jörg, and Victor Thiessen. Assessing the quality of survey data. Sage, 2012.
- Jorg Blasius and Michael Greenacre, Visualization and Verbalization of Data. CRC Press, 2014.
