= Harry Harman =

American statistician

- Born: Harry Horace Harman; June 5, 1913; Poland
- Died: June 8, 1976 (aged 63); Princeton, New Jersey, U.S.
- Education: University of Chicago
- Known for: Factor analysis
- Scientific career
- Fields: Statistics
- Institutions: System Development Corporation; Educational Testing Service
- Academic advisors: Karl Holzinger

Harry Horace Harman (June 5, 1913 – June 8, 1976) was a Polish-born American statistician known for his work on factor analysis. A fellow of the American Psychological Association, he served as president of the Psychometric Society from 1968 to 1969 and of the Society of Multivariate Experimental Psychology from 1974 to 1975. He died of a heart attack in Princeton, New Jersey, on June 8, 1976.
