= Joop Hox =

Dutch psychologist

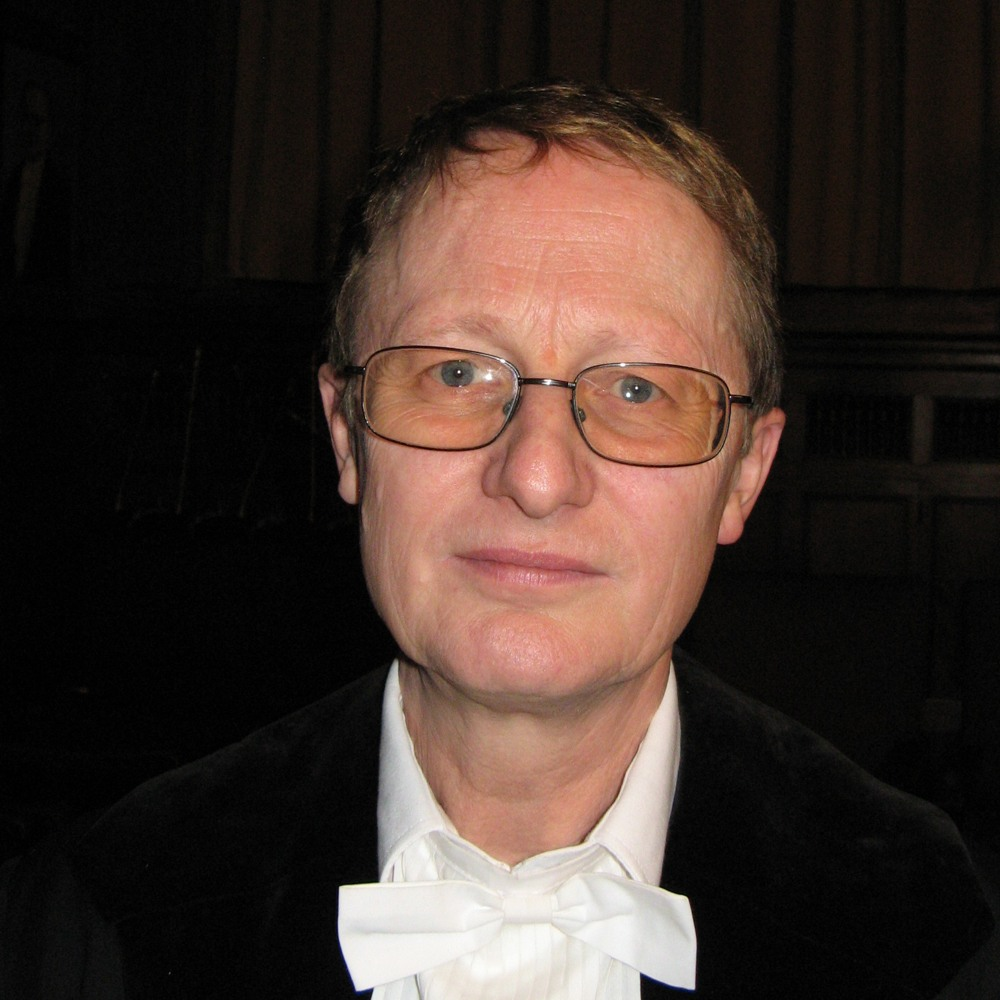
- Joop Hox, Utrecht 2009.
- Born: December 29, 1949 (age 76); Roermond
- Education: University of Amsterdam
- Scientific career
- Fields: Psychologist
- Workplaces: Utrecht University
- Thesis: The use of auxiliary theories on operationalization (1986)
- Doctoral advisor: Don Mellenbergh
- Website: http://joophox.net/

Josephus Johannes Cornelis Maria (Joop) Hox (born 1949) is a Dutch psychologist and Professor of Social Science Methodology at the Utrecht University, known for his work in the field of social research method such as survey research and multilevel modeling.

== Biography ==
Hox attended the Bisschoppelijk College Roermond from 1962 to 1968, and the Whitman College from 1968 to 1969. After receiving his MS in psychology, he received his PhD in 1986 from the University of Amsterdam under supervision of Don Mellenbergh with a thesis, entitled "Het gebruik van hulptheorieën bij operationalisering: een studie rond het begrip subjectief welbevinden" (The use of auxiliary theories on operationalization: a study of the concept of subjective well-being). In 1990 was a Fulbright scholar at the University of California, Los Angeles.

From 1977 to 1996 Hox was assistant professor at the University of Amsterdam at the department of Gerard de Zeeuw. In 1997 he was appointed Professor of Social Science Methodology at the Faculty of Social Sciences of the Utrecht University, which he started with the inaugural lecture, entitled "nieuws onder de zon: nieuwe oplossingen voor oude problemen" (There is nothing new under the sun: new solutions to old problems). One of his PhD students is Ger Snijkers. Hox also participates in the Interuniversity Graduate School of Psychometrics and Socio Metrics (IOPS) and chaired the Netherlands Organization for Social-Methodological Research (NOSMO).

== Work ==
Hox's research interests lie in the field of quality assurance of survey research and multilevel analysis of hierarchically structured data. In multi-level analysis it is assumed that the data to be investigated has hierarchical or layered structure. Special modeling techniques have been developed to map this kind of data. These techniques can often significantly improve the quality of the obtained survey data.

== Selected publications ==
Hox published several books and numerous articles. A selection:

- Hox, Joop J. Multilevel analysis: Techniques and applications. Psychology Press, 2002.

Articles, a selection:

- Hox, Joop J., and Edith D. De Leeuw. "A comparison of nonresponse in mail, telephone, and face-to-face surveys." Quality and Quantity 28.4 (1994): 329-344.
- Hox, Joop J., and Ita GG Kreft. "Multilevel analysis methods." Sociological Methods & Research 22.3 (1994): 283-299.
- Lensvelt-Mulders, G. J., Hox, J. J., Van der Heijden, P. G., & Maas, C. J. (2005). "Meta-analysis of randomized response research thirty-five years of validation." Sociological Methods & Research, 33(3), 319-348.
- Maas, Cora JM, and Joop J. Hox. "Robustness issues in multilevel regression analysis." Statistica Neerlandica 58.2 (2004): 127-137.
- Maas, Cora JM, and Joop J. Hox. "Sufficient sample sizes for multilevel modeling." Methodology: European Journal of Research Methods for the Behavioral and Social Sciences 1.3 (2005): 86.
- Sprong, M., Schothorst, P., Vos, E., Hox, J., & Van Engeland, H. (2007). "Theory of mind in schizophrenia Meta-analysis." The British Journal of Psychiatry, 191(1), 5-13.
