= Psicothema =

Psychology journal

- Discipline: Psychology
- Language: English
- Edited by: Laura E. Gómez

Publication details
- History: 1989–present
- Publisher: Colegio Oficial de Psicologia de Asturias (Spain)
- Frequency: Quarterly
- Open access: Yes
- License: CC-BY-NC-ND
- Impact factor: 3.5 (2024)

Standard abbreviations
- ISO 4: Psicothema

Indexing
- ISSN: 0214-9915 (print); 1886-144X (web)
- OCLC no.: 851319691

Links
- Journal homepage; Online access; Previous issues

Psicothema is a quarterly peer-reviewed diamond open access academic journal covering psychology. It was established in 1989 in Asturias (Spain) and is published by the Psychological Association of the Principality of Asturias. The editor-in-chief is Laura E. Gómez (Universidad de Oviedo). According to the Journal Citation Reports, the journal has a 2024 impact factor of 3.5. According to the Journal Citation Reports, the journal has a 2024 impact factor of 3.5.
