= Edith de Leeuw =

Dutch psychologist

Edith D. de Leeuw
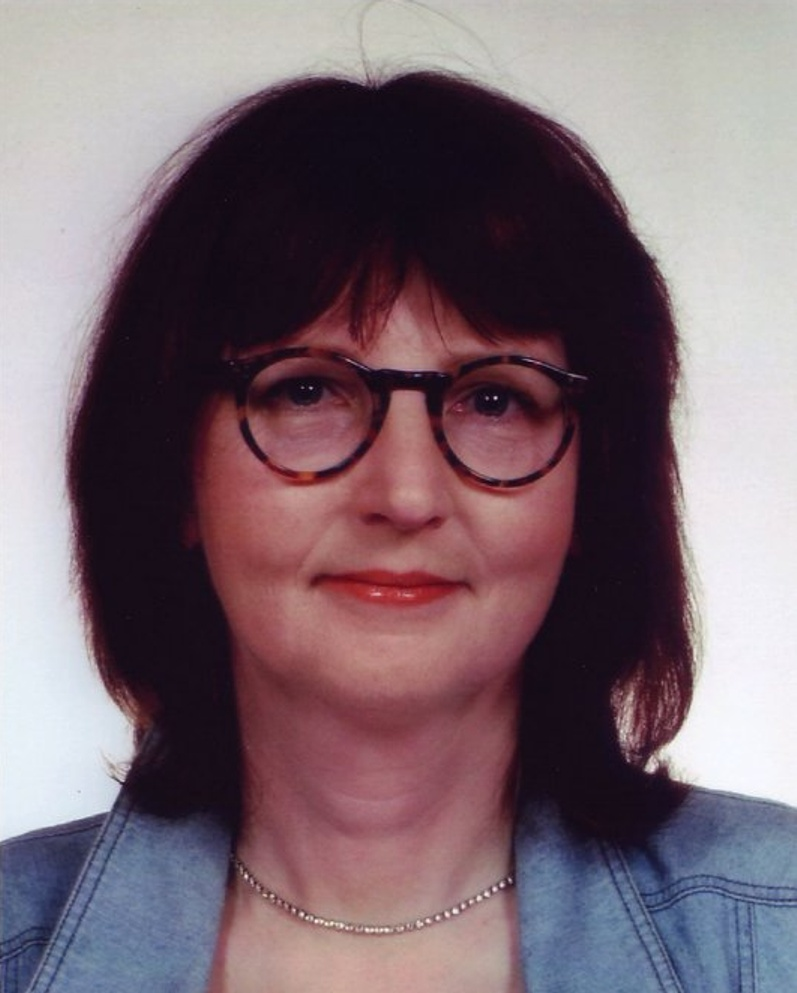
- Edith D. de Leeuw, 2000s
- Born: April 12, 1962 (age 64); Amsterdam
- Education: VU University Amsterdam
- Scientific career
- Fields: Psychologist
- Workplaces: Utrecht University
- Thesis: Data quality in mail, telephone and face to face surveys (1992)
- Doctoral advisor: Hans van der Zouwen, Don Mellenbergh
- Website: edithl.home.xs4all.nl

Edith Desiree de Leeuw (born April 12, 1962) is a Dutch psychologist, statistician, research methodologist, and professor in survey methodology and survey quality, at the University of Utrecht. She is known for her work in the field of survey research.

== Biography ==
Born in Amsterdam, De Leeuw attended the Lely Lyceum in Amsterdam. She obtained her BA in psychology in 1975 at the University of Amsterdam, where in 1982 she also obtained her MA in psychology. In 1992 she obtained her PhD in the social and cultural sciences at the VU University Amsterdam under Hans van der Zouwen and Don Mellenbergh with the thesis, entitled "Data quality in mail, telephone and face to face surveys."

De Leeuw started her academic career as Assistant Coordinator at the SISWO institute, Research Institute for Social and Economic Sciences in 1981. In 1983–84 she was assistant professor of psychology at the University of Utrecht. At the University of Amsterdam she started as assistant professor of psychology in 1983, and associate professor of education in 1985. From 1988 to 1991 she was research fellow for the Netherlands Organisation for Scientific Research, and from 1991 to 1995 Senior Research Fellow at the VU University Amsterdam. In 1999 she moved back to the University of Utrecht as Senior lecturer Methods & Statistics, and was appointed full professor in survey methodology and survey quality in 2009.

In 1987 De Leeuw had received a Fulbright scholarship to study at the Social and Economic Sciences Research Center of Washington State University. She was also visiting scholar at University of California, Los Angeles, research fellow at the Inter Universities Joint Institute for Psychometrics and Socio Metrics (IOPS) in the Netherlands, and a visiting fellow at the International University of Surrey. She is associate editor of the Journal of Official Statistics since 2000. She came into prominence as assistant to Wim T. Schippers in the National Science Quiz, where she participated from 1994 to 2002.

== Recognition ==
De Leeuw won the outstanding service award of the European Survey Research Association in 2017.

== Selected publications ==
- de Leeuw, Edith Desiree. Data Quality in Mail, Telephone and Face to Face Surveys. TT Publikaties, 1992.
- de Leeuw, Edith Desirée, Joop J. Hox and Don A. Dillman, eds. International handbook of survey methodology. Taylor & Francis, 2008.

Articles, a selection

- De Leeuw, Edith D., and Johannes Van der Zouwen. "Data quality in telephone and face to face surveys: a comparative meta-analysis." Telephone survey methodology (1988): 283–299.
- Hox, Joop J., and Edith D. De Leeuw. "A comparison of nonresponse in mail, telephone, and face-to-face surveys." Quality and Quantity 28.4 (1994): 329–344.
- Deeg, Dorly JH, et al. "Attrition in the Longitudinal Aging Study Amsterdam: The effect of differential inclusion in side studies." Journal of clinical epidemiology 55.4 (2002): 319–328.
- De Leeuw, Edith D., and W. de Heer. "Trends in household survey nonresponse: A longitudinal and international comparison." in: Survey Nonresponse, Groves, R.M. et al. (eds.), (2002): 41–54.
- De Leeuw, Edith D. "To mix or not to mix data collection modes in surveys." Journal of Official Statistics. Stockholm – 21.2 (2005): 233.
