= Measuring the Mind =

2005 book by Denny Borsboom

- Author: Denny Borsboom
- Publisher: Cambridge University Press
- Publication date: 2005
- Media type: Hardcover
- Pages: 183
- ISBN: 978-0-521-84463-5
- OCLC: 254153121
- Dewey Decimal: 150.15195 22
- LC Class: BF39 .B693 2005

Measuring the Mind: Conceptual Issues in Contemporary Psychometrics is a book by Dutch academic Denny Borsboom, Assistant Professor of Psychological Methods at the University of Amsterdam, at time of publication. The book discusses the extent to which psychology can measure mental attributes such as intelligence and examines the philosophical issues that arise from such attempts.

The book examines three major models within psychometrics; classical test theory/true scores, latent variables/item response theory and representational measurement theory. Each theory is examined against three perspectives or “stances”:

- The formal stance: how the model is formulated in terms of its syntax and semantics
- The empirical stance: how the model handles data in empirical research
- The ontological stance: whether the psychometric concepts of the model are useful fictions or are part of an objective, external reality

The book also examines the relationship between the three models and finally ends with a discussion on the concept of validity.

== Book Structure ==
The book has six chapters including an introduction. Three chapters are devoted to each model.

=== 1. Introduction ===
Borsboom discusses the importance of psychological testing and hence the importance of measurement models in psychometrics. He describes such models as “local philosophies of science” and goes on to discuss several major “global” philosophies of science; logical positivism, instrumentalism, and social constructivism all of which he describes as “anti-realist” to contrast with realist views of science.

=== 2. True scores ===
This chapter discusses classical test theory's central concept of the true score. It covers the history and fundamental axioms of classical test theory and goes on to discuss the philosophical implications of true scores. Borsboom describes the strengths and limitations of true scores in this way:

Classical test theory was either one of the best ideas in twentieth-century psychology, or one of the worst mistakes. The theory is mathematically elegant and conceptually simple, and in terms of its acceptance by psychologists, it is a psychometric success story. However, as is typical of popular statistical procedures, classical test theory is prone to misinterpretation. One reason for this is the terminology used: if a competition for the misnomer of the century existed, the term 'true score' would be a serious contestant. The infelicitous use of the adjective 'true' invites the mistaken idea that the true score on a test must somehow be identical to the 'real', 'valid', or 'construct' score. This chapter has hopefully proved the inadequacy of this view beyond reasonable doubt.

=== 3. Latent Variables ===
This chapter discusses the theory behind latent variables in psychometrics particularly with regard to item response theory. In particular Borsboom discusses issues of causality with regard to latent variables and the extent to which latent variables can be regarded as “causes” of between-subject differences and also be treated as a causal factor within a subject.

=== 4. Scales ===
This chapter discusses measurement scales as the central concept of representational measurement theory. The chapter looks at the history behind psychological measurement scales and also at attempts to formalise measurement properties such as additive conjoint measurement. Borsboom also discusses what he terms “the problem of error”, that is the inability of such theories to handle the error that is intrinsic within psychological measurement.

If the ability to construct a homomorphic representation were to be a necessary condition for measurement, this entails that we should be able to gather data that fit the measurement model perfectly. This is because, strictly speaking, models like the conjoint model are refuted by a single violation of the axioms...Since we can safely assume that we will not succeed in error-free data – certainly not in psychology – we must choose two conclusions: either measurement is impossible, or it is not necessary to create a perfect homomorphic representation. If we accept the former, we may just as well stop the discussion right now. If we accept the latter, then we have to invent a way to deal with error.

== Reviews ==
- Jacqueline P. Leighton (2008), "Measuring the mind: Conceptual issues in contemporary psychometrics, by Borsboom, D", Journal of Educational Measurement, 45 (1): 91–94, doi:10.1111/j.1745-3984.2007.00053_1.x (Pay-per-view. First page displayed free).

"The six chapters of the book reflect an impressive interplay between philosophy of science, measurement, and mathematics. Consequently, readers who enjoy probing the why behind how we think about true scores, latent variables, scales, relations between models, and ultimately validity will, I think, relish the contents of the book."

- Ramin Mojtabai (2006), "Book review", Psychological Medicine, 36, Cambridge University Press: 131–133, doi:10.1017/S0033291705236814, S2CID 149891937 (Pay-per-view. Doi link may not work).

"Overall, this is a well-written and well-argued book and theoretically minded psychometricians will find it of interest. While reading the book, I often found myself arguing with the author and, at the end I came away with more questions than answers. For me, these are the hallmarks of a good book."

- Joel Michell (2008), "Review: The Measure of Psychometrics DENNY BORSBOOM, Measuring the Mind: Conceptual Issues in Contemporary Psychometrics. Cambridge: Cambridge University Press, 2005. 185 pp. ISBN 13 978—0—521—84463—0 (HBK)", Theory & Psychology, 18: 135, doi:10.1177/09593543080180010102, S2CID 145617548 (Pay-per-view).

"Psychometrics is an important sub-discipline. It not only sustains a significant psycho-technology, it also leads social science on its Pythagorean quest. It is therefore strange that, unlike behaviourism or psychoanalysis, it has eluded critical, conceptual scrutiny. Perhaps its foundations seemed secure. This book scuttles that illusion and deftly exposes its soft underbelly."
