= Norman Cliff =

American psychologist (born 1930)

- Born: September 1, 1930; Royal Oak, Michigan, U.S.
- Education: Wayne State University; Princeton University
- Known for: Cliff's delta
- Scientific career
- Fields: Psychology

Norman Cliff (born September 1, 1930) is an American psychologist. He received his Ph.D. from Princeton in psychometrics in 1957. After research positions in the US Public Health Service and at Educational Testing Service he joined the University of Southern California in 1962. He has had a number of research interests, including quantification of cognitive processes, scaling and measurement theory, computer-interactive psychological measurement, multivariate statistics, and ordinal methods. One of his major contributions to psychometrics was the method for rotation of canonical components. Asserting that much of psychological data have only ordinal justification, Cliff also published various papers and a book on ordinal methods for research. On the one hand this included extensions to the established ordinal methods for correlating data (i.e. Kendall's tau, Spearman's rank correlation coefficient). However, on the other hand, Cliff also suggested that there are viable and robust ordinal alternatives to mean comparisons. He introduced a measure of proportional difference (or dominance) between two sets of data often referred to as Cliff's delta. He has been president of the Psychometric Society and of the Society for Multivariate Experimental Psychology. Now an Emeritus Professor, he lives in New Mexico.
