= Psychometrika =

- Discipline: Psychometrics
- Language: English
- Edited by: Sandip Sinharay

Publication details
- History: 1936-present
- Publisher: Cambridge University Press (United States)
- Frequency: 5 issues per year
- Impact factor: 3.1 (2024)

Standard abbreviations
- ISO 4: Psychometrika

Indexing
- CODEN: PSMTA2
- ISSN: 0033-3123 (print); 1860-0980 (web)

Links
- Journal homepage; Online archive; Society homepage

Psychometrika is the official journal of the Psychometric Society, a professional body dedicated to psychometrics and quantitative psychology. The journal focuses on quantitative methods for the measurement and evaluation of human behavior, including statistical methods and other mathematical techniques. Past editors include Marion Richardson, Dorothy Adkins, Norman Cliff, and Willem J. Heiser. According to Journal Citation Reports, the journal had an impact factor of 3.1 in 2024.

== History ==
In 1935, LL Thurstone, EL Thorndike and JP Guilford founded Psychometrika and also the Psychometric Society.

== Editors-in-chief ==
The current editor of the journal is Sandip Sinharay of Educational Testing Service. The complete list of editor-in-chief of Psychometrika can be found at:

https://www.psychometricsociety.org/content/past-psychometrika-editors

The following is a subset of persons who have been editor-in-chief of Psychometrika:

- Paul Horst
- Albert K. Kurtz
- Dorothy Adkins
- Norman Cliff
- Roger Millsap
- Shizuhiko Nishisato
- Willem J. Heiser
- Irini Moustaki
- Matthias von Davier

== Some notable papers ==
- Rashevsky, Nikolas (1936). "Mathematical biophysics and psychology". Psychometrika. 1 (1): 1–26. doi:10.1007/BF02287921. S2CID 8824637.
- Hotelling, Harold (1936). "Simplified calculation of principal components". Psychometrika. 1 (1): 27–35. doi:10.1007/BF02287921. S2CID 8824637.
- Eckart, Carl; Young, Gale (1936). "The approximation of one matrix by another of lower rank". Psychometrika. 1 (3): 211–218. doi:10.1007/BF02288367. S2CID 10163399.
- Thurstone, Louis L. (1945). "The prediction of choice". Psychometrika. 10 (4): 237–253. doi:10.1007/BF02288891. PMID 21007982. S2CID 34975753.
- Guttman, Louis (1945). "A basis for analyzing test-retest reliability". Psychometrika. 10 (4): 255–282. doi:10.1007/BF02288892. PMID 21007983. S2CID 17220260.
- Cronbach, Lee J. (1951). "Coefficient alpha and the internal structure of tests". Psychometrika. 16 (3): 297–334. CiteSeerX 10.1.1.452.6417. doi:10.1007/BF02310555. S2CID 13820448.
- Kaiser, Henry F. (1958). "The varimax criterion for analytic rotation in factor analysis". Psychometrika. 23 (3): 187–200. doi:10.1007/BF02289233. S2CID 120450249.
- Kruskal, J. B. (1964). "Multidimensional scaling by optimizing goodness of fit to a nonmetric hypothesis". Psychometrika. 29 (1): 1–27. doi:10.1007/BF02289565. S2CID 48165675.
- Horn, John L. (1965). "A rationale and test for the number of factors in factor analysis". Psychometrika. 30 (2): 179–185. doi:10.1007/BF02289447. PMID 14306381. S2CID 19663974.
- Tucker, Ledyard R. (1966). "Some mathematical notes on three-mode factor analysis". Psychometrika. 31 (3): 279–311. doi:10.1007/BF02289464. PMID 5221127. S2CID 44301099.
- Tucker, Ledyard R.; Lewis, Charles. (1973). "A reliability coefficient for maximum likelihood factor analysis". Psychometrika. 38 (1): 1–10. doi:10.1007/BF02291170. S2CID 50680436.
- Bentler, Peter M. (1980). "Linear structural equations with latent variables". Psychometrika. 45 (3): 289–308. doi:10.1007/BF02293905. S2CID 120921766.
- Akaike, Hirotugu (1987). "Factor analysis and AIC". Psychometrika. 52 (3): 317–332. doi:10.1007/BF02294359. S2CID 186239616.

== See also ==
- List of scientific journals in statistics
