= Structural Equation Modeling (journal) =

- Discipline: Statistics, psychometrics
- Language: English
- Edited by: George Marcoulides

Publication details
- History: 1994-present
- Publisher: Taylor & Francis
- Frequency: Quarterly
- Impact factor: 6.181 (2021)

Standard abbreviations
- ISO 4: Struct. Equ. Model.

Indexing
- ISSN: 1532-8007 (print); 1070-5511 (web)
- LCCN: 94643082
- OCLC no.: 45007191

Links
- Journal homepage; Online access

Structural Equation Modeling is a peer-reviewed scientific journal publishing methodological and applied papers on structural equation modeling, a blend of multivariate statistical methods from factor analysis to systems of regression equations, with applications across a broad spectrum of social sciences as well as biology. One of the founders and the current editor-in-chief of the journal is George Marcoulides (University of California, Riverside).

According to Journal Citation Reports, the journal has a 2021 impact factor of 6.181.
