= Journal of Personality =

- Discipline: Personality psychology
- Language: English
- Edited by: Howard Tennen

Publication details
- History: 1932–present
- Publisher: Wiley-Blackwell
- Frequency: Bimonthly
- Impact factor: 5.117 (2020)

Standard abbreviations
- ISO 4: J. Pers.

Indexing
- ISSN: 0022-3506 (print); 1467-6494 (web)
- LCCN: 34009089
- OCLC no.: 1353902

Links
- Journal homepage; Online access; Online archive

The Journal of Personality is a bimonthly peer-reviewed academic journal covering personality psychology. It is published by Wiley-Blackwell and the editor-in-chief is Howard Tennen (University of Connecticut). The journal covers research on personality, particularly on personality and behavior dynamics, personality development, and cognitive, affective, and interpersonal individual differences. According to the Journal Citation Reports, the journal has a 2020 impact factor of 5.117.

The journal began in 1932 as Character and Personality. It took on its current name in 1945.
