= Peter Molenaar =

Dutch developmental and mathematical psychologist

Peter C. M. Molenaar
- Born: 1946 (age 79–80)
- Education: University of Utrecht
- Awards: 2013 Sells Award for Distinguished Multivariate Research from the Society of Multivariate Experimental Psychology
- Scientific career
- Fields: Developmental psychology Mathematical psychology
- Workplaces: University of Amsterdam; Pennsylvania State University

Peter C. M. Molenaar (born 1946) is a Dutch developmental and mathematical psychologist who is Distinguished Professor of Human Development and Family Studies at Pennsylvania State University (Penn State). He is the editor-in-chief of Multivariate Behavioral Research.

== Biography ==
Molenaar received two bachelor's degrees from the University of Utrecht: one in 1972 and one in 1976. He also received two master's degrees from the University of Utrecht in 1976, one in mathematical psychology and one in psychophysiology, before earning his Ph.D. in Social Sciences from the same university in 1981. He then served on the faculty of the University of Amsterdam, where he eventually became head of the Department of Methodology, before joining the faculty of Penn State in 2005. In 2013, he received the Sells Award for Distinguished Multivariate Research from the Society of Multivariate Experimental Psychology.
