= Leona S. Aiken =

Professor of psychology

- Education: Virginia Commonwealth University; Purdue University
- Scientific career
- Fields: Psychology
- Institutions: Temple University; Arizona State University
- Thesis: Perceptual classification of random and schematic visual patterns: A feature processing approach (1970)
- Doctoral advisor: Donald R. Brown

Leona Ruth Silver Aiken is an American President's Professor of psychology at Arizona State University.

She is the co-author of two widely used statistics textbooks, Applied Multiple Regression/Correlation Analysis for the Behavior Sciences and Multiple Regression: Testing and interpreting interactions.

== Education and career ==
Aiken graduated from Virginia Commonwealth University in 1965, and completed a PhD in psychology at Purdue University in 1970. She joined the Temple University faculty in 1969, and moved to Arizona State University in 1985. At Arizona State, she was given the President's Professorship in 2010.

== Research ==
In terms of substantive research, Aiken specializes in women's health protective behavior. This research involves the application of a two-stage process, the first stage being psychosocial modeling, followed by the second stage of model based intervention. An example of this two-stage process can be seen in one of her studies, where peer perception of middle schoolers was used to model high school success, followed by suggestions on how peer perception should be reflected on by both the students and their parents.

In terms of methodological research, Leona Aiken specializes in models containing continuous variable interactions, which includes analysis of variance, multiple regression analysis, multivariate analysis, and structural equation modeling.

== Awards and honors ==
Aiken is fellow of the Association for Psychological Science, of the American Psychological Association in 4 divisions, and of the Western Psychological Association. Leona Aiken is an elected member of the Society of Multivariate Experimental Psychology, and was president of the society in 2006.
