= Quantitative psychology =

Field of scientific study

Quantitative psychology is a field of scientific study that focuses on the mathematical modeling, research design and methodology, and statistical analysis of psychological processes. It includes tests and other devices for measuring cognitive abilities. Quantitative psychologists develop and analyze a wide variety of research methods, including those of psychometrics, a field concerned with the theory and technique of psychological measurement.

Psychologists have long contributed to statistical and mathematical analysis, and quantitative psychology is now a specialty recognized by the American Psychological Association. Doctoral degrees are awarded in this field in a number of universities in Europe and North America, and quantitative psychologists have been in high demand in industry, government, and academia. Their training in both social science and quantitative methodology provides a unique skill set for solving both applied and theoretical problems in a variety of areas.

== History ==
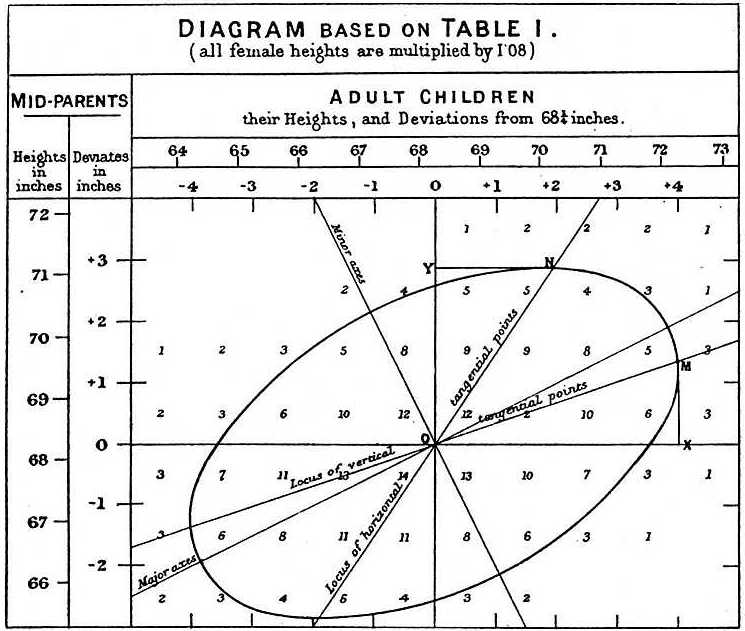
Francis Galton's correlation diagram, 1875

Quantitative psychology has its roots in early experimental psychology when, in the nineteenth century, the scientific method was first systematically applied to psychological phenomena. Notable contributions included E. H. Weber's studies of tactile sensitivity (1830s), Fechner's development and use of psychophysical methods (1850–1860), and Helmholtz's research on vision and audition beginning after 1850. Wilhelm Wundt is often called the "founder of experimental psychology", because he called himself a psychologist and opened a psychological laboratory in 1879 where many researchers came to study. The work of these individuals and many others dispelled the assertion, by theorists such as Immanuel Kant, that psychology could not become a science because precise experiments on the human mind were impossible.

=== Intelligence testing ===
Intelligence testing has long been an important branch of quantitative psychology. The nineteenth-century English statistician Francis Galton, a pioneer in psychometrics, was the first to create a standardized test of intelligence, and he was among the first to apply statistical methods to the study of human differences and their inheritance. He came to believe that intelligence is largely determined by heredity, and he also hypothesized that other measures such as the speed of reflexes, muscle strength, and head size are correlated with intelligence. He established the world's first mental testing center in 1882; in the following year, he published his observations and theories in "Inquiries into Human Faculty and Its Development".

=== Statistical techniques ===
IQ scores represented by a normal distribution

Statistical methods are the quantitative tools most used by psychologists. Karl Pearson introduced the correlation coefficient and the chi-squared test. The 1900–1920 period saw the t-test (Student, 1908), the ANOVA (Fisher, 1925) and a non-parametric correlation coefficient (Spearman, 1904). A large number of tests were developed in the latter half of the 20th century (e.g., all multivariate tests). More recently, popular multivariate techniques were developed—including the hierarchical linear model, structural equation modeling, and independent component analysis.

In 1946, psychologist Stanley Smith Stevens organized levels of measurement into four scales, Nominal, Ordinal, Ratio, and Interval, in a paper that is still often cited. Jacob Cohen, a New York University professor of psychology, analyzed quantitative methods involving statistical power and effect size, which helped to lay foundations for current statistical meta-analysis and the methods of estimation statistics. He gave his name to Cohen's kappa and Cohen's d.

== Education and training ==
=== Undergraduate ===
Training for quantitative psychology can begin informally at the undergraduate level. Many graduate schools recommend that students have some coursework in psychology and complete the full college sequence of calculus (including multivariate calculus) and a course in linear algebra. Quantitative coursework in other fields such as economics and research methods and statistics courses for psychology majors are also helpful. Historically, however, students without all these courses have been accepted if other aspects of their application show promise. Some schools also offer formal minors in areas related to quantitative psychology. For example, the University of Kansas offers a minor in "Social and Behavioral Sciences Methodology" that provides advanced training in research methodology, applied data analysis, and practical research experience relevant to quantitative psychology. Coursework in computer science is also useful. Mastery of an object-oriented programming language or learning to write code in R, SAS, or SPSS is useful for the type of data analysis performed in graduate school.

=== Graduate ===
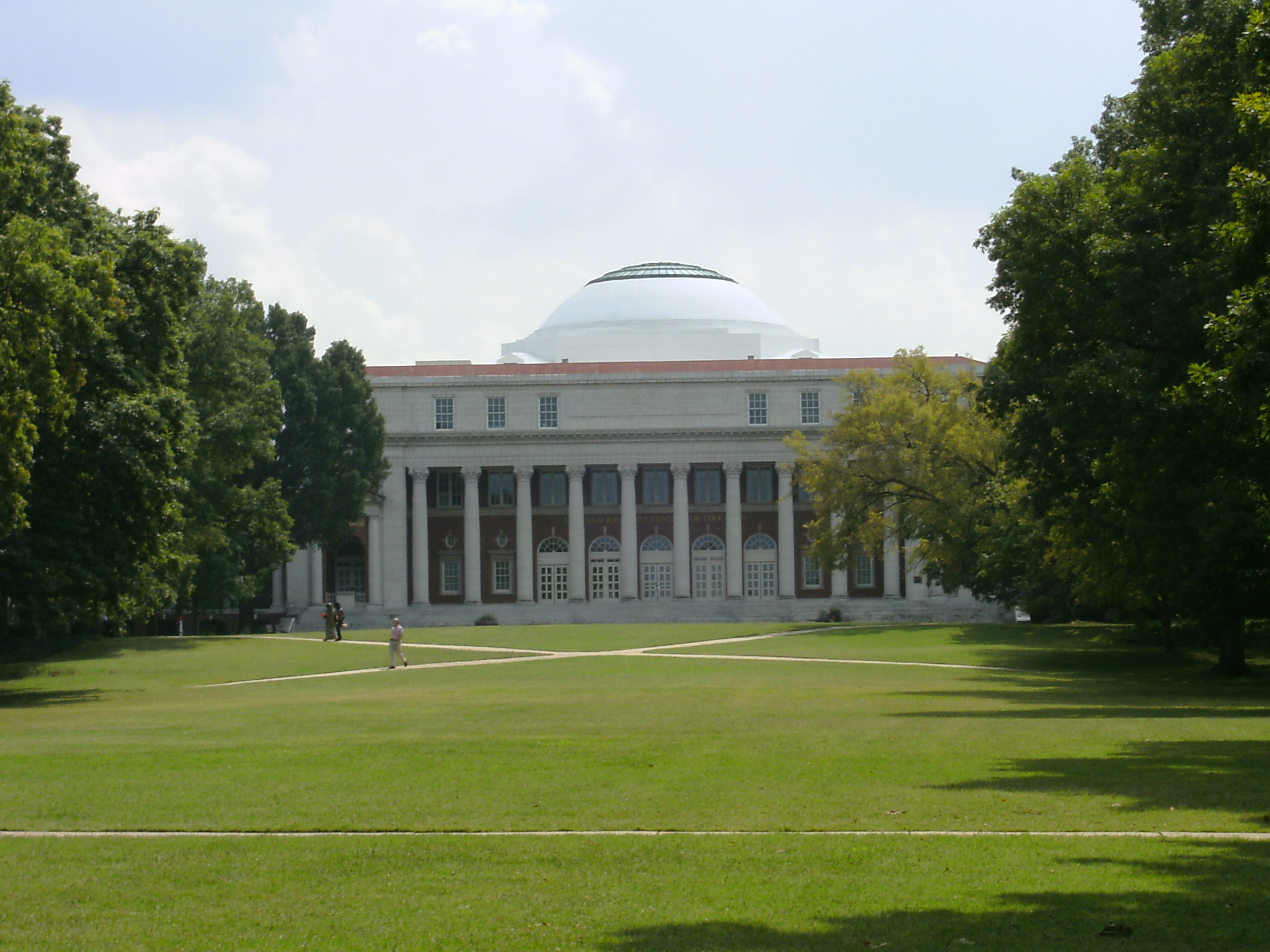
Peabody College (pictured) at Vanderbilt University houses their Quantitative Methods program.

Quantitative psychologists may possess a doctoral degree or a master's degree. Due to its interdisciplinary nature and depending on the research focus of the university, these programs may be housed in a school's college of education or in their psychology department. Programs that focus especially in educational research and psychometrics are often part of education or educational psychology departments. These programs may therefore have different names mentioning "research methods" or "quantitative methods", such as the "Research and Evaluation Methodology" Ph.D. from the University of Florida or the "Quantitative Methods" degree at the University of Pennsylvania. However, some universities may have separate programs in their two colleges. For example, the University of Washington has a "Quantitative psychology" degree in their psychology department and a separate "Measurement & Statistics" Ph.D. in their college of education. Others, such as Vanderbilt University's Ph.D. in Psychological Sciences, are jointly housed across two psychology departments.

Universities with a mathematical focus include McGill University's "Quantitative Psychology and Modeling" program and Purdue University's "Mathematical and Computational Psychology" degrees. Students with an interest in modeling biological or functional data may go into related fields such as biostatistics or computational neuroscience.

Doctoral programs typically accept students with only bachelor's degrees, although some schools may require a master's degree before applying. After the first two years of studies, graduate students typically earn a Master of Arts in Psychology, Master of Science in Statistics or Applied Statistics, or both. For example, most students in the University of Minnesota's "Quantitative and Psychometric Methods" Ph.D. program are also Master of Science students in the School of Statistics. Additionally, several universities offer minor concentrations in quantitative methods, such as New York University.

Companies that produce standardized tests such as College Board, Educational Testing Service, and American College Testing are some of the largest private sector employers of quantitative psychologists. These companies also often provide internships to students in graduate school.

==== Shortage of qualified applicants ====
In 1990, an influential paper titled "Graduate Training in Statistics, Methodology, and Measurement in Psychology" was published in the American Psychologist journal. This article discussed the need for increased and up-to-date training in quantitative methods for psychology graduate programs in the United States. In August 2005, the American Psychological Association expressed the need for more quantitative psychologists in the industry—for every PhD awarded in the subject, there were about 2.5 quantitative psychologist position openings. Due to a lack of applicants in the field, the APA created a Task Force to study the state of quantitative psychology and predict its future. Domestic U.S. applicants are especially lacking. The majority of international applicants come from Asian countries, especially South Korea and China. In response to the lack of qualified applicants, the APA Council of Representatives authorized a special task force in 2006. The task force was chaired by Leona S. Aiken from Arizona State University.

== Research areas ==
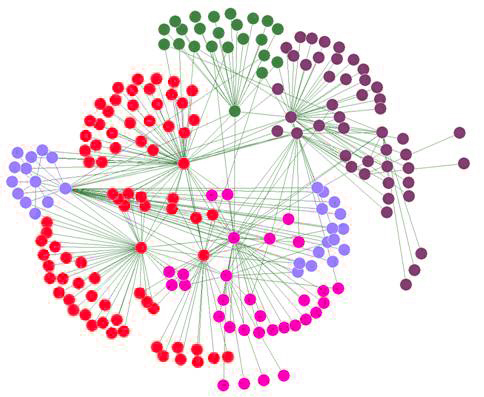
Example of a social network diagram

Quantitative psychologists generally have a main area of interest. Notable research areas in psychometrics include item response theory and computer adaptive testing, which focus on education and intelligence testing. Other research areas include structural equation modeling, social network analysis, human decision science, statistical genetics, and modeling psychological processes through time series analysis, such as in fMRI data collection.

Two common types of psychometric tests are aptitude tests, which are supposed to measure raw intellectual suitability for a purpose, and personality tests, which aim to assess tendencies toward certain thoughts, feelings, or behaviors.

Item response theory (IRT) is based on the application of related mathematical models to testing data. Because it is generally regarded as superior to classical test theory, it is the preferred method for developing scales in the United States. IRT is especially preferred when optimal decisions are demanded in so-called high-stakes tests, such as the Graduate Record Examination (GRE) and Graduate Management Admission Test (GMAT).

== Professional organizations ==
Quantitative psychology is served by several scientific organizations. These include the Psychometric Society, Division 5 of the American Psychological Association (Quantitative and Qualitative Methods), the Society of Multivariate Experimental Psychology, and the European Society for Methodology. Associated disciplines include statistics, mathematics, educational measurement, educational statistics, sociology, and political science. Several scholarly journals reflect the efforts of scientists in these areas, notably Psychometrika, Psychological Methods, Multivariate Behavioral Research, Journal of Mathematical Psychology, and Structural Equation Modeling (journal).

== Notable people ==
The following is a select list of quantitative psychologists or people who have contributed to the field:

- Leona S. Aiken
- Anne Anastasi
- Gwyneth Boodoo
- Raymond Cattell
- Jacob Cohen
- Lee Cronbach
- Louis Guttman
- Frederic M. Lord
- Quinn McNemar
- Paul E. Meehl
- Jacqueline Meulman
- Peter Molenaar
- John Nesselroade
- Pip Pattison
- James O. Ramsay
- Robert L. Thorndike
- Louis Leon Thurstone
- Helen M. Walker

== See also ==
- List of schools for quantitative psychology
- Mathematical psychology
- Measuring the Mind
- Network neuroscience
- Psychophysics
- Psychometrics
- Psychometrika
- Multivariate Behavioral Research
- Journal of Mathematical Psychology
- Structural Equation Modeling (journal)
- Quantitative psychological research
- WinBUGS
