= Society of Multivariate Experimental Psychology =

The Society of Multivariate Experimental Psychology (SMEP) is a small academic organization of research psychologists who have interests in multivariate statistical models for advancing psychological knowledge. It publishes a journal, Multivariate Behavioral Research.

== History ==
SMEP was founded in 1960 by Raymond Cattell and others as an organization of scientific researchers interested in applying complex multivariate quantitative methods to substantive problems in psychology. The two main functions of the society are to hold an annual meeting of scientific or quantitative psychology specialists and to publish a journal, Multivariate Behavioral Research. The first meeting of the Society was held in Chicago in the fall of 1961. Beginning in 1993, the meeting has been held annually.

== Membership ==
The new members of SMEP are elected by existing members, and membership is considered to be honorific. To promote interaction among participants in the annual meeting, the membership is limited to 65 active members under the age of 65, as well as to emeritus members (active members aged 65 and older who attend the annual meeting regularly). The Bylaws of SMEP stipulate that there should be twice the number of nominees for membership as available slots.

=== Presidents ===
The president of SMEP is elected by the membership and the list of former presidents is below.

- 2027: Jeffrey Harring
- 2026: Daniel J. Bauer
- 2025: Michael Neale
- 2024: Laura M. Stapleton
- 2023: Sy-Miin Chow
- 2022: Lesa Hoffman
- 2021: Niels Waller
- 2020: David P. MacKinnon
- 2019: Peter Molenaar
- 2018: Debbi Bandalos
- 2017: David Kaplan
- 2016: Ken Bollen
- 2015: Alan Nicewander
- 2014: William Shadish
- 2013: Steven M. Boker
- 2012: Scott M. Hofer
- 2011: Scott E. Maxwell
- 2010: Lisa L. Harlow
- 2009: Patrick E. Shrout
- 2008: Wayne F. Velicer
- 2007: Stephen G. West
- 2006: Leona S. Aiken
- 2005: James H. Steiger
- 2004: Joseph Lee Rodgers
- 2003: David Rindskopf
- 2002: Roderick McDonald
- 2001: Roger Millsap
- 2000: Robert C. MacCallum
- 1999: John R. Nesselroade
- 1998: Michael W. Browne
- 1997: Susan Embretson
- 1996: Keith F. Widaman
- 1995: Linda M. Collins
- 1994: Robert Cudeck
- 1993: Patricia R. Cohen
- 1992: John J. McArdle
- 1991: Stanley A. Mulaik
- 1990: Herbert W. Eber
- 1989: John C. Loehlin
- 1988: William M. Meredith
- 1987: Andrew L. Comrey
- 1986: A. Ralph Hakstian
- 1985: Henry F. Kaiser
- 1984: William Revelle
- 1983: Norman Cliff
- 1982: J. Douglas Carroll
- 1981: Jack Block
- 1980: Jerry Wiggins
- 1979: Peter M. Bentler
- 1978: John M. Digman
- 1977: Goldine C. Gleser
- 1976: John L. Horn
- 1975: Douglas N. Jackson
- 1974: Lewis R. Goldberg
- 1973: Harry H. Harman
- 1972: Desmond S. Cartwright
- 1971: Warren T Norman
- 1970: Maurice Lorr]
- 1969: Jacob Cohen
- 1968: Donald W. Fiske
- 1967: Robert C. Tryon, succeeded by Merrill Roff
- 1966: Chester W. Harris
- 1965: Benjamin Fruchter
- 1964: John W. French
- 1963: Charles F. Wrigley
- 1962: Saul B. Sells
- 1961: Raymond B. Cattell
- 1960: Raymond B. Cattell

== Annual meeting ==
The annual meeting spans two and one half days and consists exclusively of presentations by members in a single session. The program is arranged to allow ample discussion of each presentation. Since 2003, a half-day graduate student pre-conference has been held in conjunction with the annual meeting. PhD students sponsored by SMEP members present their research to those attending the annual meeting. The meeting also elects a new president.

In addition, the Society grants multiple annual awards. The Sells Award, named after Saul Sells, is given for distinguished multivariate research to an individual that has made a lifetime-level achievement in the field of multivariate psychology research. The Tanaka Award, named for Jeffrey Tanaka, is given for the best article in Multivariate Behavioral Research that year. The SMEP Early Career Research Award is given to a young researcher that the Society believes shows promise of high quality work throughout their future career. The final annual award is the Barbara Byrne Award, named for Barbara M. Byrne and granted for an outstanding book or edited volume within the field of multivariate analysis. The Society also has the Eber Award, which is not an annual award, but it is granted at the annual meeting after nomination and voting by the Trustees to reward outstanding service to the Society.

== Journal ==
The SMEP journal, Multivariate Behavioral Research (MBR), publishes research articles on multivariate methodology and its use in psychological research. The Editor of MBR is Emilio Ferrer, and the journal is published by Taylor & Francis Group.

SMEP and Taylor & Francis also cooperate in the publication of a series of books on applications of multivariate quantitative methods to important substantive research issues. The book series is edited by Lisa Harlow.

The Society uses revenue from the journal to fund programs that promote learning of statistical methods in psychology and education, with a special emphasis on increasing the number of persons from under-represented groups in quantitative psychology.
