= Psychological Methods =

- Discipline: Psychology
- Language: English
- Edited by: Fred Oswald

Publication details
- History: 1996-present
- Publisher: American Psychological Association (United States)
- Frequency: Quarterly
- Impact factor: 7.8 (2024)

Standard abbreviations
- ISO 4: Psychol. Methods

Indexing
- ISSN: 1082-989X (print); 1939-1463 (web)

Links
- Journal homepage; Online access

Psychological Methods is a peer-reviewed academic journal published by the American Psychological Association. It was established in 1996 and covers "the development and dissemination of methods for collecting, analyzing, understanding, and interpreting psychological data". The editor-in-chief is Fred Oswald (University of California, Irvine). The founding editor was Mark I. Appelbaum.

The journal has implemented the Transparency and Openness Promotion (TOP) Guidelines. The TOP Guidelines provide structure to research planning and reporting and aim to make research more transparent, accessible, and reproducible.

== Abstracting and indexing ==
The journal is abstracted and indexed by MEDLINE/PubMed and the Social Sciences Citation Index. According to the Journal Citation Reports, the journal has a 2024 impact factor of 7.8.
