= Multivariate Behavioral Research =

- Discipline: psychology and statistics
- Language: English
- Edited by: Peter C. M. Molenaar (2015-present)

Publication details
- History: 1966–present
- Publisher: Taylor & Francis (United States of America)
- Frequency: Bimonthly
- Impact factor: 3.691 (2017)

Standard abbreviations
- ISO 4: Multivar. Behav. Res.

Indexing
- ISSN: 0027-3171 (print); 1532-7906 (web)

Links
- Journal homepage; Online access; Online archive

Multivariate Behavioral Research is a peer-reviewed academic journal published by Taylor & Francis Group on behalf of the Society of Multivariate Experimental Psychology. The editor-in-chief is Peter Molenaar (Pennsylvania State University). Its 2017 impact factor is 3.691.
