= List of schools for quantitative psychology =

This is a nonexhaustive list of schools that offer degrees in quantitative psychology or related fields such as psychometrics or research methodology. Programs are typically offered in departments of psychology, educational psychology, or human development. Various organizations, including the American Psychological Association's Division 5, the Canadian Psychological Association, the National Council for Measurement in Education, and the Society of Multivariate Experimental Psychology have compiled lists of programs.

== Graduate degree programs ==
=== Structure ===
Records are listed alphabetically by university in descending order. Within a given university, records are sorted by degree (doctorate, then master's). Inclusion criteria are described on the talk page.

- University section
  - University – The university listed is the primary institution/organization which grants the degree. The link provided links to the Wikipedia page for the university.
  - Department – The department listed is the primary department which grants the degree. The link provided links to the department's website.
- Program section
  - Terminal degree – This is the final degree granted to the student within that degree track. Many doctoral programs in the US have joint MA/Ph.D programs. Those degrees are listed within the same record under the final degree granted (e.g., Doctorate of Philosophy). The link provided directs to the description of the degree.
  - Program – This is the name of the degree program. The link typically directs to the degree requirements. Many times the Terminal Degree page and the Program page are the same.
  - Specialty – This subsection identifies various tracks within a degree program. Not all programs have this level of specialty. If applicable, the link directs to the primary page detailing the specialization requirements.
  - Faculty – This section lists the tenured/tenure-track faculty currently listed on the program's website with a primary appointment. Emeritus professors are excluded from this list.
- Source – The source lists the academic organization which identified the program as a quantitative program. Multiple organizations can be listed. See the talk page for more details.

=== List of formal degrees ===
University			Program				Source
Country	University	Department	Terminal degree	Program	Specialty	Faculty	
United States	University of Alabama	Department of Educational Studies in Psychology, Research Methodology, and Counseling	Doctor of Philosophy	Educational Research	Measurement	7: Youn-Jeng Choi; Aaron Kuntz; Kelly Guyotte; Jamie Mills; Randall Schumacker; Sara Elizabeth Tomek; Stefanie Wind	NCME
United States	University of Alabama	Department of Educational Studies in Psychology, Research Methodology, and Counseling	Educational Specialist	Educational Research/Psychology			NCME
Canada	University of Alberta	Department of Educational Psychology	Doctor of Philosophy	Measurement, Evaluation, and Data Science		6: Okan Bulut; Ying Cui; Mark J. Gierl; Sharla King; Maria Cutumisu; Cheryl Poth	NCME
Canada	University of Alberta	Department of Educational Psychology	Master of Education	Measurement, Evaluation, and Data Science			NCME
Netherlands	University of Amsterdam	Department of Psychology	Master of Science	Psychology	Psychological Methods	15: Eric-Jan Wagenmakers; Denny Borsboom; Don Mellenbergh; Han van der Maas; Maarten Marsman; Lourens Waldorp; Sacha Epskamp; Raoul Grasman; Dora Matzke; Leendert van Maanen; Dylan Molenaar; Claire Stevenson; Julia Haaf; Riet van Bork; Abe Hofman	
United States	University of Arizona	Educational Psychology	Doctor of Philosophy	Educational Psychology	Measurement and Methodology	?	NCME
United States	Arizona State University	Department of Psychology	Doctor of Philosophy	Psychology	Quantitative Psychology	6: Samantha Anderson; Michael Edwards; Kevin Grimm; David MacKinnon; Daniel McNeish; Stephen West	SMEP
United States	Arizona State University	Department of Family and Human Development	Doctor of Philosophy	Family and Human Development	Measurement And Statistical Analysis	8: Dawn DeLay; Samuel Green; Eric Hedberg; Masumi Iida; Justin Jager; Roy Levy; Marilyn Thompson; Natalie Wilkens	NCME
United States	Arizona State University	College of Public Service & Community Solutions	Master of Science	Program Evaluation		?	
United States	Auburn University	Department of Educational Foundations, Leadership, and Technology	Doctor of Philosophy	Educational Psychology	Measurement and Evaluation	?	NCME
United States	Ball State University	Department of Educational Psychology	Master of Arts	Educational Psychology	Statistical and Research Methods	?	NCME
United States	Baylor University	Department of Statistical Science	Doctor of Philosophy	Statistical Science	Psychometrics and Biostatistics	?	NCME
United States	Baylor University	Department of Educational Psychology	Master of Arts	Educational Psychology	Quantitative Methods	?	
United States	Boston College	Department of Psychology	Doctor of Philosophy	Psychology	Quantitative Psychology	2: Ehri Ryu; Hao Wu	SMEP
United States	Boston College	Measurement, Evaluation, Statistics, & Assessment (MESA)	Doctor of Philosophy	Measurement, Evaluation, Statistics, & Assessment (MESA)		?	NCME
United States	Boston College	Measurement, Evaluation, Statistics, & Assessment (MESA)	Master of Education	Measurement, Evaluation, Statistics, & Assessment		?	NCME
United States	Boston College	Measurement, Evaluation, Statistics, & Assessment (MESA)	Master of Science	Applied Statistics and Psychometrics		?	
United States	Brigham Young University	Department of Instructional Psychology & Technology	Doctor of Philosophy	Instructional Psychology and Technology	Instructional Research and Evaluation	?	NCME
United States	Brigham Young University	Department of Instructional Psychology & Technology	Master of Science	Instructional Psychology and Technology	Instructional Research and Evaluation	?	NCME
Canada	University of British Columbia	Department of Psychology	Doctor of Philosophy	Psychology	Quantitative Methods	3: Jeremy Biesanz; Victoria Savalei; Jason Rights	CPA, SMEP
Canada	University of British Columbia	Department of Educational and Counselling Psychology, and Special Education	Doctor of Philosophy	Measurement, Evaluation and Research Methodology	Measurement, Psychometrics, Statistical Science, Test Development, Program Evaluation	5: Bruno D. Zumbo; Amery D. Wu; Sandra Mathison; Ed Kroc; Anita M. Hubley	NCME
Canada	University of British Columbia	Department of Educational and Counselling Psychology, and Special Education	Master of Arts	Measurement, Evaluation and Research Methodology	Measurement, Psychometrics, Statistical Science, Test Development, Program Evaluation	5: Bruno D. Zumbo; Amery D. Wu; Sandra Mathison; Ed Kroc; Anita M. Hubley	NCME
Canada	University of British Columbia	Department of Educational and Counselling Psychology, and Special Education	Master of Education	Measurement, Evaluation and Research Methodology	Measurement, Psychometrics, Statistical Science, Test Development, Program Evaluation	5: Bruno D. Zumbo; Amery D. Wu; Sandra Mathison; Ed Kroc; Anita M. Hubley	NCME
United States	University of California, Berkeley	Graduate School of Education	Doctor of Philosophy	Policy, Organization, Measurement, and Evaluation	Quantitative Methods and Evaluation	?	NCME
United States	University of California, Berkeley	Graduate School of Education	Doctor of Philosophy	Policy, Organization, Measurement, and Evaluation	Program Evaluation and Assessment	?	NCME
United States	University of California, Davis	Department of Psychology	Doctor of Philosophy	Psychology	Quantitative Psychology	7: Emilio Ferrer; Mijke Rhemtulla; Philippe Rast; Shelley Blozis; Jonathan J. Park; Siwei Liu; Jeffrey Schank	SMEP
United States	University of California, Davis	School of Education	Master of Arts	Education	Educational Assessment and Measurement	?	
United States	University of California, Irvine	Department of Cognitive Sciences	Doctor of Philosophy	Cognitive Sciences	Mathematical psychology, Cognitive modeling, Bayesian methods	11: Barbara Dosher; Jean-Claude Falmagne; Geoffrey Iverson; Michael D. Lee; Mimi Liljeholm; Louis Narens; Zygmunt Pizlo; Jeffrey N. Rouder; George Sperling; Mark Steyvers; Joachim Vandekerckhove	
United States	University of California, Los Angeles	Psychology Department	Doctor of Philosophy	Psychology	Quantitative Psychology	5: Peter M. Bentler; Craig Enders; Han Du; Amanda Montoya; Steven P. Reise	SMEP
United States	University of California, Los Angeles	Department of Education	Doctor of Philosophy	Social Research Methodology	Advanced Quantitative Methods, Educational Research Methods, Evaluation	6: Li Cai; Christina Christle; Jose-Felipe Martinez; Teresa McCarty; Michael Seltzer; Noreen Webb; Minjeong Jeon; Matthew Madison	NCME, SMEP
United States	University of California, Los Angeles	Department of Education	Master of Arts	Social Research Methodology			NCME
United States	University of California, Merced	Department of Psychological Sciences	Doctor of Philosophy	Psychological Sciences	Quantitative Methods, Measurement, and Statistics	5: Sarah Depaoli; Fan Jia; Keke Lai; Ren Liu; Haiyan Liu; Jack Vevea; William Shadish (Emeritus)	SMEP
United States	University of California at Santa Barbara	Interdisciplinary	Doctor of Philosophy	Interdisciplinary	Quantitative Methods in the Social Sciences	?	
United States	University of California at Santa Barbara	Department of Education	Doctor of Philosophy	Education	Policy, Leadership, and Research Methods	?	NCME
United States	University of California at Santa Barbara	Department of Education	Master of Arts	Education	Policy, Leadership, and Research Methods	?	NCME
United States	University of Cincinnati	School of Education	Doctor of Philosophy	Educational Studies	Quantitative and Mixed Methods Research Methodologies	?	
United States	University of Cincinnati	School of Education	Master of Arts	Educational Studies	Applied Research Methods	?	
United States	The City University of New York	Department of Educational Psychology	Doctor of Philosophy	Educational Psychology	Quantitative Methods in Educational and Psychological Research	5: Howard Everson; Keith Markus; Philip Ramsey; David Rindskopf; Jay Verkuilen	SMEP
United States	Claremont Graduate University	Division of Behavioral and Organizational Sciences	Doctor of Philosophy	Psychology	Evaluation & Applied Research Methods	?	
United States	University of Colorado at Boulder	School of Education	Doctor of Philosophy	Research and Evaluation Methodology		?	NCME
United States	University of Connecticut	Department of Educational Psychology	Doctor of Philosophy	Measurement, Evaluation and Assessment		?	NCME
United States	University of Connecticut	Department of Educational Psychology	Master of Arts	Education	Measurement, Evaluation and Assessment	?	NCME
United States	University of Delaware	School of Education	Doctor of Philosophy	Education	Evaluation, Measurement and Statistics	?	NCME
United States	University of Denver	Department of Research Methods and Information Science	Doctor of Philosophy	Research Methods and Statistics		?	NCME
United States	University of Denver	Department of Research Methods and Information Science	Master of Arts	Research Methods and Statistics		?	NCME
United States	Florida State University	College of Education	Doctor of Philosophy	Measurement and Statistics		6: Russell Almond; Betsy Becker; Salih Binic; Insu Paek; Yanyun Yang; Qian Zhang	NCME, SMEP
United States	Florida State University	College of Education	Doctor of Philosophy	Educational Leadership and Policy	Education Policy and Evaluation	?	
United States	Florida State University	College of Education	Doctor of Education	Educational Leadership and Policy	Education Policy and Evaluation	?	
United States	Florida State University	College of Education	Master of Science	Measurement and Statistics		?	NCME
United States	Florida State University	College of Education	Master of Science	Education Policy and Evaluation		?	
United States	University of Florida	Research and Evaluation Methodology Program	Doctor of Philosophy	Research and Evaluation Methodology	Qualitative Methods	?	NCME
United States	University of Florida	Research and Evaluation Methodology Program	Master of Arts in Education	Research and Evaluation Methodology		?	NCME
United States	University of Florida	Research and Evaluation Methodology Program	Master of Arts	Education	Research and Evaluation Methodology	?	NCME
United States	University of Florida	Research and Evaluation Methodology Program	Master of Education	Research and Evaluation Methodology		?	NCME
United States	Fordham University	Psychology Department	Doctor of Philosophy	Psychology	Psychometrics and Quantitative Psychology	4: David Budescu; Heining Cham; Leah Feuerstahler; Se-Kang Kim	NCME, SMEP
United States	Fordham University	Psychology Department	Master of Science	Applied Psychological Methods			
United States	Georgia Institute of Technology	School of Psychology	Doctor of Philosophy	Psychology	Quantitative Psychology	3: Susan Embretson; James S. Roberts; Davood Tofighi	NCME, SMEP
United States	Georgia State University	Research, Measurement and Statistics Program	Doctor of Philosophy	Educational Policy Studies	Research, Measurement and Statistics	?	NCME
United States	Georgia State University	Research, Measurement and Statistics Program	Master of Science	Educational Research	?	NCME	
United States	University of Georgia	Department of Educational Psychology	Doctor of Philosophy	Educational Psychology	Quantitative Methodology	?	NCME
United States	University of Georgia	Department of Lifelong Education, Administration, and Policy	Doctor of Philosophy	Qualitative Research and Evaluation Methodologies	Program evaluation	?	
United States	University of Georgia	Department of Educational Psychology	Master of Education	Educational Psychology	Quantitative Methodology	?	NCME
United States	University of Georgia	Department of Educational Psychology	Master of Arts	Educational Psychology	Quantitative Methodology	?	NCME
United States	University of Hawaii at Manoa	Department of Educational Psychology	Doctor of Philosophy	Educational Psychology	Measurement, Statistics, and Evaluation	?	NCME
United States	University of Hawaii at Manoa	Department of Educational Psychology	Master of Education	Educational Psychology	Measurement, Statistics, and Evaluation Strand	?	
United States	University of Illinois at Chicago	Department of Educational Psychology	Doctor of Philosophy	Educational Psychology	Measurement, Evaluation, Statistics, and Assessment	?	NCME
United States	University of Illinois at Chicago	Department of Educational Psychology	Master of Education	Educational Psychology	Measurement, Evaluation, Statistics, and Assessment	?	NCME
United States	University of Illinois at Chicago	Department of Educational Psychology	Online Master of Education	Educational Psychology	Measurement, Evaluation, Statistics, and Assessment Online	?	NCME
United States	University of Illinois at Urbana Champaign	Department of Educational Psychology	Doctor of Philosophy	Studies in Interpretive, Statistical, Measurement and Evaluative Methodologies for Education	Educational Measurement; Evaluation; Statistics; Research Design	6: Carolyn Anderson; Hua-Hua Chang; Jennifer Greene; Joseph Robinson-Cimpian; Thomas A. Schwandt; Jinming Zhang	NCME, SMEP
United States	University of Illinois at Urbana Champaign	Department of Psychology	Doctor of Philosophy	Psychology	Quantitative	4: Hua-Hua Chang; Hans-Friedrich Koehn; Michel Regenwetter; Michelle Yongmei Wang	SMEP
United States	University of Illinois at Urbana Champaign	Department of Educational Psychology	Master of Science	Studies in Interpretive, Statistical, Measurement and Evaluative Methodologies for Education		?	NCME
United States	Illinois State University	Educational Administration & Foundations Department	Doctor of Philosophy	Educational Administration	Research and Evaluation	?	NCME
United States	Illinois State University	Department of Psychology	Master of Science	Psychology	Quantitative Psychology	3: Matthew Hesson-McInnis; Jeffrey Kahn; Julie Campbell	
United States	Indiana University	School of Education	Doctor of Philosophy	Inquiry Methodology		?	NCME
United States	Indiana University	School of Education	Master of Science Education	Learning and Developmental Sciences	Inquiry Methodology	?	
United States	University of Iowa	Department of Psychological and Quantitative Foundations	Doctor of Philosophy	Educational Measurement and Statistics		?	NCME
United States	University of Iowa	Department of Psychological and Quantitative Foundations	Master of Arts	Educational Measurement and Statistics		?	NCME
United States	James Madison University	Department of Graduate Psychology	Doctor of Philosophy	Assessment and Measurement		9: Allison J. Ames; Deborah Bandalos; Christine E. Demars; Monica K. Erbacher; Sara J. Finney; Keston Fulcher; John D. Hathcoat; Sonia Jeanne Horst; Dena A. Pastor	NCME
United States	James Madison University	Department of Graduate Psychology	Master of Arts	Psychological Sciences	Quantitative Psychology		
United States	University of Kansas	Department of Psychology	Doctor of Philosophy	Psychology	Quantitative Psychology	2: Holdger Brandt; Tim Pleskac	SMEP
United States	University of Kansas	Department of Educational Psychology	Doctor of Philosophy	Educational Psychology and Research	Research, Evaluation, Measurement, and Statistics	?	NCME
United States	University of Kansas	Department of Educational Psychology	Master of Science in Education	Educational Psychology and Research	Research, Evaluation, Measurement, and Statistics	?	NCME
United States	Kent State University	School of Foundations, Leadership and Administration	Doctor of Philosophy	Evaluation and Measurement		?	NCME
United States	Kent State University	School of Foundations, Leadership and Administration	Master of Education	Evaluation and Measurement		?	NCME
United States	Louisiana State University	School of Education	Doctor of Philosophy	Educational Leadership and Research	Educational Research Methodology	?	NCME
United States	Louisiana State University	School of Education	Master of Arts	Educational Leadership, Research, and Counseling	Applied Research, Measurement and Evaluation	?	
United States	University of Louisville	Department of Educational and Counseling Psychology	Doctor of Philosophy	Counseling and Personnel Services	Educational Psychology, Measurement, and Evaluation	?	NCME
Netherlands	Leiden University					14: Serge Rombouts; Mark de Rooij; Tom Wilderjans; Zsuzsa Bakk; Elise Dusseldorp; Joost van Ginkel; Marjolein Fokkema; Anna van 't Veer; Peter de Heus; Mathilde Verdam; Julian Karch; Sjoerd Huisman; Tom Heyman; Wouter Weeda	
United States	Loyola University Chicago	School of Education	Doctor of Philosophy	Research Methodology		5: Eilene Edejer; Ken A. Fujimoto; Leanne Kallemeyn; Terri Pigott; Meng-Jia Wu	
Canada	University of Manitoba	Department of Psychology	Doctor of Philosophy	Psychology	Quantitative	4: Steve Hladkyj; Cam-Loi Huynh; Joanne Keselman; Johnson Li	CPA, SMEP
United States	University of Maryland	Department of Human Development and Quantitative Methodology	Doctor of Philosophy	Measurement, Statistics and Evaluation		8: Steve Hladkyj; Cam-Loi Huynh; Joanne Keselman; Johnson Li	NCME
United States	University of Maryland	Department of Human Development and Quantitative Methodology	Master of Arts	Measurement, Statistics and Evaluation		?	NCME
United States	University of Massachusetts Amherst	Department of Educational Policy, Research, and Administration	Doctor of Philosophy	Research, Educational Measurement and Psychometrics		6: Ronald Hambleton (Emeritus); Lisa Keller; Scott Monroe; Jennifer Randall; Stephen Sireci; Craig Wells	NCME, SMEP
United States	University of Massachusetts Amherst	Department of Educational Policy, Research, and Administration	Master of Education	Assessment and Policy Studies in Education		?	NCME
Canada	McGill University	Department of Psychology	Doctor of Philosophy	Experimental Psychology	Quantitative Psychology and Modeling	5: Carl Falk; Jessica Flake; Heungsun Hwang; Milica Miocevic; Thomas Shultz	CPA, SMEP
United States	Michigan State University	Department of Counseling Educational Psychology, and Special Education	Doctor of Philosophy	Measurement and Quantitative Methods	Measurement	?	NCME
United States	Michigan State University	Department of Counseling Educational Psychology, and Special Education	Doctor of Philosophy	Measurement and Quantitative Methods	Quantitative Methods	?	NCME
United States	Middle Tennessee State University	Department of Psychology	Master of Arts	Psychology	Quantitative Psychology	?	
United States	University of Minnesota	Department of Psychology	Doctor of Philosophy	Psychology	Quantitative/Psychometric Methods	4: Niels G. Waller; David J. Weiss; Katerina Marcoulides; Nate Helwig	NCME, SMEP
United States	University of Minnesota	Department of Educational Psychology	Doctor of Philosophy	Quantitative Methods in Education		?	NCME
United States	University of Minnesota	Department of Educational Psychology	Master of Arts	Quantitative Methods in Education		?	NCME
United States	University of Missouri	Department of Educational, School & Counseling Psychology	Doctor of Philosophy	Educational, School and Counseling Psychology	Statistics, Measurement, & Evaluation in Education	5: Wes Bonifay; Matt Easter; Francis Huang; Ze Wang; Wolfgang Wiedermann	NCME
United States	University of Missouri	Department of Educational, School & Counseling Psychology	Master of Arts	Educational, School and Counseling Psychology	Educational Research, Methods & Analysis	?	NCME
United States	University of Missouri	Department of Educational, School & Counseling Psychology	Master of Education	Educational, School and Counseling Psychology	Educational Research, Methods & Analysis	?	
United States	University of Missouri	Department of Psychological Sciences	Doctor of Philosophy	Psychology	Quantitative Psychology	6: Ed Merkle; Victoria Shaffer; Doug Steinley; Clintin P. Davis-Stober; Phillip K. Wood	SMEP
United States	University of Missouri	Department of Psychological Sciences	Master of Arts	Applied Psychometrics		?	
United States	University of Missouri–St. Louis	College of Education	Master of Education	Educational Psychology	Educational Research and Program Evaluation	?	
United States	Morgan State University	?	Doctor of Philosophy	?	?	?	
United States	Morgan State University	?	Master of Science	?	?	?	
United States	University of Nebraska–Lincoln	Department of Educational Psychology	Doctor of Philosophy	Quantitative, Qualitative, and Psychometric Methods		?	NCME
United States	University of Nebraska–Lincoln	Department of Educational Psychology	Master of Arts	Quantitative, Qualitative, and Psychometric Methods		?	NCME
Netherlands and Belgium	Universities in the Netherlands and Flanders	Interuniversity Graduate School for Psychometrics and Sociometrics	Doctor of Philosophy	Psychometrics and Sociometrics		?	
United States	University of Nevada, Las Vegas	Department of Educational Psychology and Higher Education	Master of Science	Educational Psychology	Evaluation	?	NCME
United States	University of Nevada, Las Vegas	Department of Educational Psychology and Higher Education	Master of Science	Educational Psychology	Quantitative Research Methodology	?	NCME
United States	New York University	Department of Applied Statistics, Social Science, and Humanities	Master of Science	Applied Statistics for Social Science Research		?	
United States	University of North Carolina at Chapel Hill	Department of Psychology and Neuroscience	Doctor of Philosophy	Psychology	Quantitative Psychology	7: Daniel Bauer; Kenneth Bollen; Patrick Curran; Kathleen Gates; Oscar Gonzalez; Abigail Panter; David Thissen (Emeritus)	NCME, SMEP
United States	University of North Carolina at Greensboro	Department of Educational Research Methodology	Doctor of Philosophy	Educational Research Methodology		?	NCME
United States	University of North Carolina at Greensboro	Department of Educational Research Methodology	Master of Science	Educational Research Methodology		?	NCME
United States	University of North Texas	Department of Educational Psychology	Doctor of Philosophy	Educational Psychology	Research, Measurement, and Statistics	?	NCME
United States	University of North Texas	Department of Educational Psychology	Master of Science	Educational Psychology	Research, Measurement, and Statistics	?	
United States	University of Notre Dame	Department of Psychology	Doctor of Philosophy	Psychology	Quantitative Psychology	7: Ying (Alison) Cheng; Ross Jacobucci; Gitta Lubke; Lijuan (Peggy) Wang; Ke-Hai Yuan; Guangjian Zhang; Zhiyong (Johnny) Zhang	SMEP
United States	Ohio State University	Department of Psychology	Doctor of Philosophy	Psychology	Quantitative Psychology	4: Michael DeKay; Gyeongcheol Cho; Jolynn Pek; Trisha Van Zandt	SMEP
United States	Ohio State University	Department of Educational Studies	Doctor of Philosophy	Educational Studies	Quantitative Research, Evaluation and Measurement	?	NCME
United States	Ohio State University	Department of Educational Studies	Master of Arts	Educational Studies	Quantitative Research, Evaluation and Measurement	?	NCME
United States	Ohio University	Department of Psychology	Doctor of Philosophy	Experimental Psychology; Clinical Psychology	Applied Quantitative Psychology (Experimental Track); Applied Quantitative Psychology (Clinical Track)	5: Francis S. Bellezza; Bruce W. Carlson; Claudia Gonzalez-Vallejo; Jeffrey B. Vancouver; Ronaldo Vigo	SMEP
United States	Oklahoma State University	School of Applied Health & Educational Psychology	Doctor of Philosophy	Educational Psychology	Research, Evaluation Measurement and Statistics	?	NCME
United States	Oklahoma State University	School of Applied Health & Educational Psychology	Master of Science	Educational Psychology	Educational Research and Evaluation	?	NCME
United States	University of Oklahoma	Department of Psychology	Doctor of Philosophy	Psychology	Quantitative Psychology	3: Hairong Song; Robert A. Terry; Jorge Mendoza	NCME, SMEP
United States	University of Oregon	Department of Educational Methodology, Policy, and Leadership	Doctor of Philosophy	Educational Leadership	Quantitative Research Methods	?	NCME
United States	Pennsylvania State University	Department of Educational Psychology, Counseling, and Special Education	Doctor of Philosophy	Educational Psychology	Research Methodology with an emphasis in educational and psychological measurement	?	NCME
United States	Pennsylvania State University	Department of Human Development and Family Studies	Doctor of Philosophy	Human Development and Family Studies	Developmental Research Methodology	6: Timothy Brick; Sy-Miin Chow; Linda M. Collins; Peter Molenaar; Zita Oravecz; Michael Rovine	SMEP
United States	University of Pennsylvania	Quantitative Methods Division	Doctor of Philosophy	Quantitative Methods		3: Robert F. Boruch; Eric T. Bradlow; Paul A. McDermott	
United States	University of Pennsylvania	Quantitative Methods Division	Master of Philosophy in Education	Quantitative Methods			
United States	University of Pennsylvania	Quantitative Methods Division	Master of Science	Statistics, Measurement, Assessment, and Research Technology			
United States	University of Pittsburgh	Department of Psychology in Education	Doctor of Philosophy	Research Methodology		?	NCME
United States	University of Pittsburgh	Department of Psychology in Education	Master of Education	Research Methodology		?	NCME
United States	University of Pittsburgh	Department of Psychology in Education	Master of Arts	Research Methodology		?	NCME
United States	Purdue University	Department of Psychological Sciences	Doctor of Philosophy	Psychological Sciences	Mathematical and Computational Cognitive Science	?	SMEP
United States	Purdue University	Department of Educational Studies	Doctor of Philosophy	Educational Psychology	Measurement and Research Methodology	?	NCME
United States	Purdue University	Department of Educational Studies	Doctor of Philosophy	Educational Psychology	Quantitative Research Methods	?	NCME
United States	Purdue University	Department of Educational Studies	Doctor of Philosophy	Educational Psychology	Educational Measurement	?	NCME
United States	Purdue University	Department of Educational Studies	Master of Science in Education	Educational Psychology	[Research Methods and Measurement]	?	NCME
United States	University of Rhode Island	Department of Psychology	Doctor of Philosophy	Behavioral Science	Research Methodology	?	
United States	Rutgers University	Department of Educational Psychology	Doctor of Philosophy	Education: Learning, Cognition, Instruction, and Development	Statistics and Measurement	?	NCME
United States	Rutgers University	Department of Educational Psychology	Master of Education	Educational Statistics, Measurement & Evaluation	Statistics and Measurement	?	NCME
United States	Rutgers University	Department of Educational Psychology	Master of Education	Educational Statistics, Measurement & Evaluation	Evaluation	?	NCME
Canada	Simon Fraser University	Department of Psychology	Doctor of Philosophy	Psychology	History, Quantitative & Theoretical Psychology	4: Mark Blair; Rachel T Fouladi; Michael Maraun; Kathleen Slaney	CPA, SMEP
United States	University of South Carolina	Department of Psychology	Doctor of Philosophy	Experimental Psychology; Clinical-Community Psychology	Quantitative Psychology	5: Donna Coffman; Amanda J. Fairchild; Alberto Maydeu-Olivares; Sarfaraz Serang; Dexin Shi	SMEP
United States	University of South Carolina	Department of Educational Studies	Doctor of Philosophy	Educational Psychology and Research	Educational Research	4: Christine DiStefano; Robert L. Johnson; Xiaofeng S. Liu; Michael A. Seaman	NCME
United States	University of South Carolina	Department of Educational Studies	Master of Education	Educational Research		?	NCME
United States	University of South Dakota	Department of Counseling and Psychology in Education	Doctor of Philosophy	Human Development and Educational Psychology	Research and Statistics Emphasis	?	NCME
United States	University of South Dakota	Department of Counseling and Psychology in Education	Educational Specialist	Human Development and Educational Psychology	Research and Statistics Emphasis	?	NCME
United States	University of South Dakota	Department of Counseling and Psychology in Education	Master of Arts	Human Development and Educational Psychology	Research and Statistics Emphasis	?	NCME
United States	University of South Florida	Department of Educational and Psychological Studies	Doctor of Philosophy	Curriculum and Instruction	Measurement and Evaluation	?	NCME
United States	University of South Florida	Department of Educational and Psychological Studies	Master of Education	Curriculum and Instruction	Measurement and Evaluation	?	NCME
United States	University of South Florida	Department of Educational and Psychological Studies	Educational Specialist	Curriculum and Instruction	Measurement and Evaluation	?	NCME
United States	University of Southern California	Department of Psychology	Doctor of Philosophy	Psychology	Quantitative Methods	4: John (Jack) McArdle; Laura Baker; Richard John; Rand Wilcox	SMEP
United States	Southern Illinois University at Carbondale	Department of Counseling, Quantitative Methods, and Special Education	Doctor of Philosophy	Quantitative Methods		?	NCME
United States	State University of New York at Albany	Division of Educational Psychology & Methodology	Doctor of Philosophy	Educational Psychology	Methodology	?	NCME
United States	State University of New York at Albany	Division of Educational Psychology & Methodology	Master of Science	Educational Psychology and Methodology		?	NCME
United States	State University of New York at Buffalo	Department of Counseling, School, and Educational Psychology	Doctor of Philosophy	Educational Psychology and Quantitative Methods		4: Jeremy Finn; Seong Won Han; Sunha Kim; Jaekyung Lee	NCME
United States	State University of New York at Buffalo	Department of Counseling, School, and Educational Psychology	Master of Art	Educational Psychology and Quantitative Methods		?	NCME
United States	Teacher's College, Columbia University	Department of Human Development	Doctor of Philosophy	Measurement and Evaluation		?	NCME
United States	Teacher's College, Columbia University	Department of Human Development	Doctor of Education	Measurement and Evaluation		?	NCME
United States	Teacher's College, Columbia University	Department of Human Development	Master of Education	Measurement and Evaluation		?	NCME
United States	Teacher's College, Columbia University	Department of Human Development	Master of Science	Applied Statistics		?	NCME
United States	University of Tennessee	Department of Educational Psychology and Counseling	Doctor of Philosophy	Educational Psychology and Research	Evaluation, Statistics, and Measurement	?	NCME
United States	Texas A&M University	Department of Educational Psychology	Master of Education (Online)	Research, Measurement and Statistics		?	
United States	University of Texas at Austin	Department of Educational Psychology	Doctor of Philosophy	Educational Psychology	Quantitative Methods	?	NCME
United States	University of Texas at Austin	Department of Educational Psychology	Master of Education	Educational Psychology	Quantitative Methods	?	NCME
Netherlands	Tilburg University	Graduate School of Social and Behavioral Sciences	Master of Science	Individual Differences and Assessment	?	16: Jelte Wicherts; Marcel van Assen; John Gelissen; Jeroen Vermunt; Ton de Waal; Katrijn van Deun; Joris Mulder; Marjan Bakker; Kim De Roover; Leonie van Grootel; Kyle Lang; Guy Moors; Michèle Nuijten; Noémi Schuurman; Inga Schwabe; Jesper Tijmstra	
United States	University of Toledo	Department of Educational Foundations and Leadership	Doctor of Philosophy	Educational Research and Measurement		?	NCME
United States	University of Toledo	Department of Educational Foundations and Leadership	Master of Arts	Research and Measurement		?	NCME
United States	Utah State University	Department of Psychology	Doctor of Philosophy	Psychology	Quantitative Psychology	5: Tyson Barrett; Jamison Fargo; Sarfaraz Serang	
United States	Utah State University	College of Education and Human Services	Doctor of Philosophy	Research and Evaluation		?	NCME
Netherlands	Utrecht University	Department of Methodology and Statistics	Master of Science	Methodology and Statistics for the Behavioural, Biomedical and Social Sciences		24: Stef van Buuren; Ellen Hamaker; Peter van der Heijden; Herbert Hoijtink; Irene Klugkist; Rens ven de Schoot; Barry Schouten; Joop Hox; Edith de Leeuw; Daniel Oberski; Peter Lugtig; Dave Hessen; Vera Toepoel; Maarten Cruyff; Bella Struminskaya; Gerko Vink; Lakshmi Balachandran Nair; Mirjam Moerbeek; Emmeke Aarts; Rebecca Kuiper; Remco Feskens; Nijs Lagerweij; Jeltje Wassenberg-Severijnen; Caspar van Lissa; Mariëlle Zondervan-Zwijnenburg; Sara van Erp	
United States	Vanderbilt University	Department of Psychology and Human Development	Doctor of Philosophy	Psychological Sciences	Quantitative Methods	8: Sun-Joo Cho; David Cole; Shane Hutton; David Lubinski; Kris Preacher; Joseph Lee Rodgers; Sonya Sterba; Andy Tomarken; Hao Wu	SMEP
United States	Vanderbilt University	Department of Psychology and Human Development	Master of Education	Quantitative Methods			
United States	Virginia Tech	Faculty of Leadership, Counseling and Research	Doctor of Philosophy	Educational Research and Evaluation	Measurement	3: Gary Skaggs; Serge Hein; Michael Cook	NCME
United States	Virginia Tech	Faculty of Leadership, Counseling and Research	Doctor of Philosophy	Educational Research and Evaluation	Statistics	2: Yasuo Miyazaki; David Kniola	NCME
United States	University of Virginia	Department of Psychology	Doctor of Philosophy	Psychology	Quantitative Methodology	6: Steve Boker; James Freeman; John Nesselroade; Karen Schmidt; Xin (Cynthia) Tong; Eric Turkheimer	SMEP
United States	University of Virginia	School of Education	Doctor of Philosophy	Education	Research, Statistics and Evaluation	?	NCME
United States	University of Virginia	School of Education	Master of Education	Educational Psychology	Research, Statistics and Evaluation	?	
United States	Washington State University	College of Education	Doctor of Philosophy	Educational Psychology	Research, Evaluation, and Measurement	?	NCME
United States	University of Washington	College of Education	Doctor of Philosophy	Educational Psychology	Measurement & Statistics	?	NCME
United States	University of Washington	Department of Psychology	Doctor of Philosophy	Psychology	Quantitative Psychology	Brian Flaherty	
United States	Western Michigan University	Department of Educational Leadership, Research and Technology	Doctor of Philosophy	Evaluation, Measurement and Research		?	NCME
United States	Western Michigan University	Department of Educational Leadership, Research and Technology	Master of Arts	Evaluation, Measurement and Research		?	
Canada	University of Western Ontario	Department of Psychology	Doctor of Philosophy	Psychology	Personality and Measurement	?	CPA
United States	University of Wisconsin-Madison	Department of Educational Psychology	Doctor of Philosophy	Educational Psychology	Quantitative Methods	?	NCME, SMEP
United States	University of Wisconsin-Milwaukee	Department of Educational Psychology	Doctor of Philosophy	Educational Psychology	Educational Statistics & Measurement	?	NCME, SMEP
Canada	York University	Department of Psychology	Doctor of Philosophy	Psychology	Quantitative Methods	5: Robert Cribbie; David Flora; Michael Friendly; Ji Yeh Choi; R. Philip Chalmers	CPA, SMEP

=== Select minors and certificates in quantitative methods ===
- Ball State University
- University of California, Riverside
- Kent State University
- Michigan State University
- New York University
- Ohio State University
- Washington State University
- Texas Christian University
- Virginia Tech
