= Jean-Claude Falmagne =

French mathematician and quantitative psychology researcher (born 1934)

- Jean-Claude Falmagne
- Born: 1934 (age 91–92); Brussels, Belgium
- Education: Université libre de Bruxelles
- Known for: Knowledge Space Theory
- Scientific career
- Fields: psychology mathematics

Jean-Claude Falmagne (French pronunciation: [ʒɑ̃ klod falmaɲ]; born February 4, 1934, in Brussels, Belgium) is a mathematical psychologist whose scientific contributions deal with problems in reaction time theory, psychophysics, philosophy of science, measurement theory, decision theory, and educational technology. Together with Jean-Paul Doignon, he developed knowledge space theory, which is the mathematical foundation for the ALEKS software for the assessment of knowledge in various academic subjects, including K-12 mathematics, chemistry, and accounting.

== Early life and career ==
After finishing high school, Falmagne spent two years in the Belgian army, where he became an officer. Military service was mandatory in Belgium at the time. In 1954, he enrolled at the University of Brussels (Université libre de Bruxelles) as a student in the psychology department. He received his undergraduate degree in 1959 and was hired as an assistant at the University of Brussels, which is a faculty position in the Belgian system. He obtained his Ph.D. degree in 1965 from the same institution.

While working on his doctoral dissertation, which dealt with reaction times, Falmagne became interested in the applications of mathematics to the cognitive sciences. In 1964, he was invited by Patrick Suppes to spend the summer at Stanford University. He presented the results of his dissertation at a conference there and met several prominent mathematical psychologists, including Bill Estes, Dick Atkinson, and Duncan Luce, and the mathematician János Aczél. Suppes, Luce, and Aczél had a strong influence on Falmagne's choice of scientific career and on his approach to solving scientific problems. His visit to Stanford convinced him that he needed to continue his education in the United States.

With the support of Fulbright and FNRS fellowships, Falmagne held post-doctoral positions at the University of Pennsylvania, the University of Wisconsin-Madison, and the University of Michigan between 1966 and 1969. His interests grew to include psychophysics, measurement theory, and probabilistic models of ordering and algebraic measurement. After short teaching stints back in Europe at the University of Brussels and the University of Paris, he returned to the United States in 1971 as a Professor of Psychology at New York University.

In 1989, he joined the faculty of University of California, Irvine, accepting an appointment at the Department of Cognitive Sciences and the Institute for Mathematical Behavioral Sciences. He remained there until his retirement in 2004.

Until 2013, Falmagne was Chairman of ALEKS Corporation, a web-based educational software company that he founded with some of his graduate students. He is currently a Research Professor at the University of California, Irvine.

== Research ==
In 1978, Falmagne solved a well-known problem, posed in 1960 by the economists H.D. Block and Jacob Marschak in their article "Random Orderings and Stochastic Theories of Responses", concerning the representation of choice probabilities by random variables and published his findings in the Journal of Mathematical Psychology.^{[F78]}

=== Knowledge spaces, media theory, learning spaces and the ALEKS software ===
In 1985, Falmagne, along with Jean-Paul Doignon, wrote “Spaces for the Assessment of Knowledge”.^{[DF85]} In this article, they presented a formal framework for the assessment of knowledge in various academic subjects, such as arithmetic, algebra, and chemistry. This early framework was combinatoric in character, and as such insufficient for a practical assessment, which is unavoidably plagued by careless errors on the part of the test takers. In time, they created a stochastic framework for the description of the evolution of an assessment, question by question.^{[FD88]} With extensive financial support from the National Science Foundation, their work on the stochastic framework led to the creation of the web-based system ALEKS for the assessment and learning of mathematics and science. Falmagne and Doignon's 2011 book, Learning Spaces,^{[FD11]} contains the most current presentation and development of the stochastic framework for the assessment of knowledge. Learning spaces are specific kinds of knowledge spaces, whose best applications are to situations where assessments guide efficient learning. Learning spaces are a part of the concept of Media Theory,^{[EFO07]} which explores the modeling of knowledge structures and knowledge states. More generally, these lines of research are collectively called Knowledge Space Theory and are being pursued by many investigators, mostly in Austria, Germany, and the Netherlands.

=== The meaningfulness of scientific laws ===
A common practice in the statement of scientific laws ensures that the mathematical expression of the law is invariant with respect to changes of units of its variables—except for the values of dimensional constants. In dimensional analysis, this invariance is implicit and captured by the concept of "quantities". In "Scales and Meaningfulness of Quantitative Laws", Falmagne and Louis Narens argue that the requirement of invariance, which they call "meaningfulness" should be part of the axioms or theory establishing the law, rather than result from them.^{[FN83]} They proposed a more powerful framework making this invariance explicit in the notation. This approach was generalized by Falmagne in "Meaningfulness and Order Invariance: Two Fundamental Principles for Scientific Laws",^{[F04]} and applied to several exemplary laws of physics.

=== Other work ===
The monograph Elements of Psychophysical Theory^{[F85]} presents the mathematical foundation of psychophysics and includes an introduction to measurement theory and functional equations. Falmagne's work in philosophy of science concerns foundational issues in algebraic measurement^{[DF69]}^{[F75]} and in probabilistic measurement.^{[F76]} A distinctive feature of his research lies in the use of functional equations in order to achieve generality.^{[F80]}^{[AF99]}^{[AF00]}^{[FD10]}

== Awards and honors ==
Falmagne is the recipient of Fulbright and Guggenheim Fellowships and of a von Humboldt Award. In 1994, he was recognized as a "Friend of NSERC" by the Natural Sciences and Engineering Research Council of Canada and János D. Aczél. That same year, he was elected as a member of the New York Academy of Sciences. He is also a fellow of the Society of Experimental Psychologists. He received an Innovation Award from the University of California, Irvine in 2004 and a doctoris honoris causa degree in science from the University of Graz in 2005.

In celebration of Falmagne's 70th birthday in 2004, a "Falmagne Symposium" was held at the annual meeting of the European Mathematical Psychology Group in Ghent, Belgium, and a "Falmagne Festschrift Meeting" was held at the University of Michigan, Ann Arbor. Two special issues of the Journal of Mathematical Psychology were published in 2005 with the papers presented at two meetings organized to honor his 70th birthday. In 2014, a conference on meaningfulness and learning spaces was held in Irvine in honor of his 80th birthday.

In 2015 the UC Irvine Alumni Association gave him their highest honor, the Extraordinarius award.

== Selected publications ==
DF69.	Ducamp, A.; Jean-Claude Falmagne (1969). "Composite Measurement". Journal of Mathematical Psychology. 6 (3): 359–390. doi:10.1016/0022-2496(69)90012-1. hdl:2013/ULB-DIPOT:oai:dipot.ulb.ac.be:2013/179569.

F75.	Falmagne, Jean-Claude (June 1975). "A Set of Independent Axioms for Positive Holder Systems". Philosophy of Science. 42 (2): 137–151. doi:10.1086/288631. S2CID 120192071.

F76.	Falmagne, Jean-Claude (1976). "Random Conjoint Measurement and Loudness Summation". Psychological Review. 83 (1): 65–79. doi:10.1037/0033-295x.83.1.65.

F78.	Falmagne, Jean-Claude (1978). "A Representation Theorem for Finite Random Scale Systems". Journal of Mathematical Psychology. 18 (1): 52–72. doi:10.1016/0022-2496(78)90048-2.

F80.	Falmagne, Jean-Claude (1980). "A Probabilistic Theory of Extensive Measurement". Philosophy of Science. 47 (2): 277–296. doi:10.1086/288933. S2CID 122600865.

FN83.	Falmagne, Jean-Claude; L. Narens (June 1983). "Scales and Meaningfulness of Quantitative Laws". Synthese. 55 (3): 287–325. doi:10.1007/bf00485824. S2CID 12099439.

F85.	Falmagne, Jean-Claude (1985). Elements of Psychophysical Theory. Oxford University Press.

DF85.	Doignon, Jean-Paul; Jean-Claude Falmagne (August 1985). "Spaces for the Assessment of Knowledge". International Journal of Man-Machine Studies. 23 (2): 175–196. doi:10.1016/S0020-7373(85)80031-6.

FD88.	Falmagne, Jean-Claude; Jean-Paul Doignon (1988). "A Class of Stochastic Procedures for the Assessment of Knowledge". The British Journal of Mathematical and Statistical Psychology. 41: 1–23. doi:10.1111/j.2044-8317.1988.tb00884.x.

AF99.	Aczél, János; Jean-Claude Falmagne (June 1999). "Consistency of Monomial and Difference Representations of Functions Arising from Empirical Phenomena". Journal of Mathematical Analysis and Applications. 234 (2): 632–659. doi:10.1006/jmaa.1999.6391.

AF00.	Aczél, János; Jean-Claude Falmagne; R. Duncan Luce (November 2000). "Functional Equations in the Behavioral Sciences". Mathematica Japonica. 52 (3): 469–512.

F04.	Falmagne, Jean-Claude (2004). "Meaningfulness and Order Invariance: Two Fundamental Principles for Scientific Laws". Foundations of Physics. 34 (9): 1341–1384. Bibcode:2004FoPh...34.1341F. doi:10.1023/b:foop.0000044096.50863.8e. S2CID 123043119.

EFO07.	Eppstein, David; Jean-Claude Falmagne; Sergei Ovchinnikov (2007). Media Theory. Heidelberg: Springer-Verlag. ISBN 978-3-540-71696-9.

FD10.	Falmagne, Jean-Claude; Jean-Paul Doignon (August 2010). "Axiomatic Derivation of the Doppler Factor for Relativistic Speeds". Aequationes Mathematicae. 80: 85–99. arXiv:0806.0831. doi:10.1007/s00010-010-0035-0. S2CID 16806446.

FD11.	Falmagne, Jean-Claude; Jean-Paul Doignon (2011). Learning Spaces. Heidelberg: Springer-Verlag.
