= Mathematical psychology =

Mathematical modeling of psychological theories and phenomena

Mathematical psychology is an approach to psychological research that is based on mathematical modeling of perceptual, thought, cognitive and motor processes, and on the establishment of law-like rules that relate quantifiable stimulus characteristics with quantifiable behavior (in practice often constituted by task performance). There are five major research areas in mathematical psychology: learning and memory, perception and psychophysics, choice and decision-making, language and thinking, and measurement and scaling.

Mathematical psychology is not to be confused with theoretical psychology: the latter is concerned with the conceptual understanding of psychological phenomena, often through verbal reasoning which lacks mathematical formalism; the former is concerned with the formal modeling of these phenomena, often lacking conceptual explanation. The relationship is analogous to that between theoretical and mathematical physics, where the primary distinction is the standard of rigor -- the one prioritizes domain concepts, while the other prioritizes formality -- but both are in service of domain understanding.

The application of mathematics to psychology has been done in the hope of emulating the success found in the physical sciences, which dates back to at least the seventeenth century. Mathematics in psychology is used extensively in roughly two areas: one is the mathematical modeling of psychological theories and experimental phenomena, which leads to mathematical psychology; the other is the statistical approach of quantitative measurement practices in psychology, which leads to psychometrics.

As quantification of behavior is fundamental in this endeavor, the theory of measurement is a central topic in mathematical psychology. Mathematical psychology is therefore closely related to psychometrics; however, where psychometrics is concerned with individual differences in mostly static variables, mathematical psychology focuses on dynamic models of perceptual, cognitive, and motor processes. Furthermore, the goal of psychometrics is to inform the design of experiments, whereas the goal of mathematical psychology is to inform the modeling of experimental data. Like computational neuroscience and econometrics, mathematical psychology often uses statistical optimality as a guiding principle, assuming that the human brain has evolved to solve problems in an optimized way. Central themes from cognitive psychology (e.g., limited vs. unlimited processing capacity, serial vs. parallel processing) and their implications are central in rigorous analysis in mathematical psychology.

Mathematical psychologists are active in many fields of psychology, especially in psychophysics, sensation and perception, problem solving, decision-making, learning, memory, language, and the quantitative analysis of behavior; they contribute to the work of other subareas of psychology such as clinical psychology, social psychology, educational psychology, and psychology of music.

== History ==
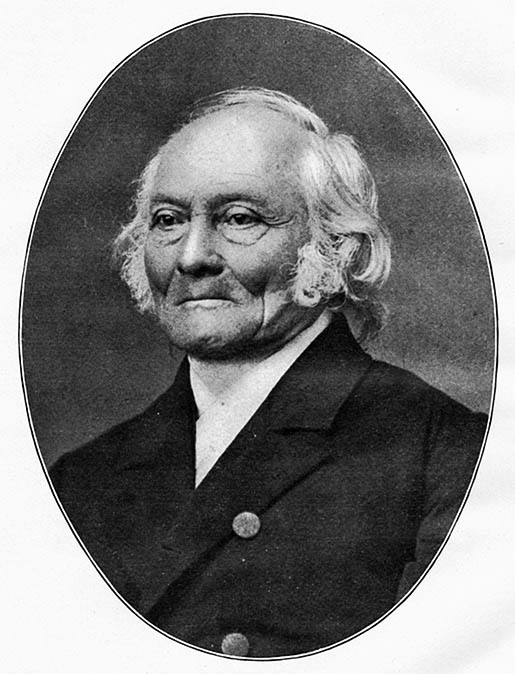
Ernst Heinrich Weber

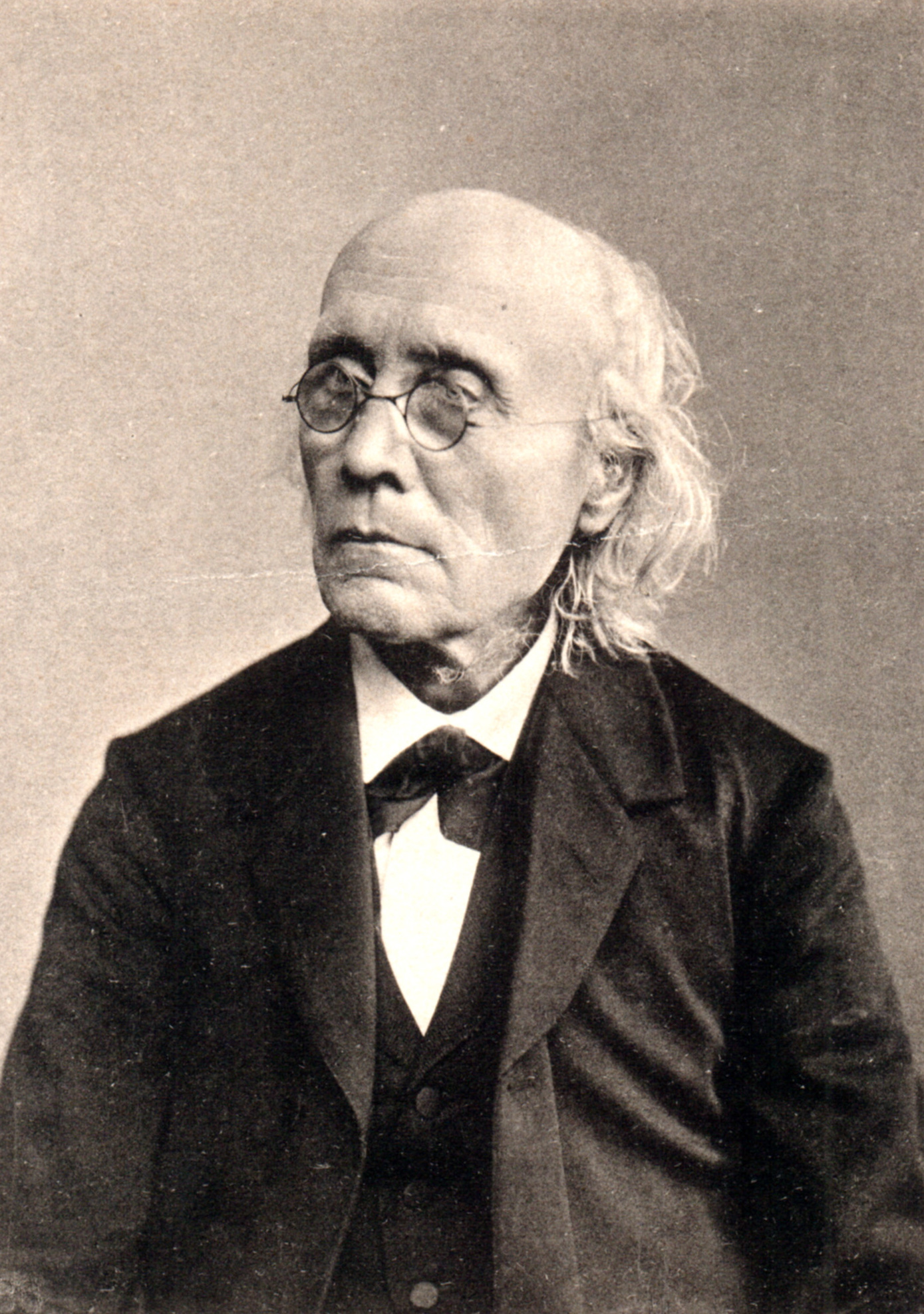
Gustav Fechner

=== Mathematics and psychology before the 19th century ===
Choice and decision making theory are rooted in the development of statistics theory. In the mid 1600s, Blaise Pascal considered situations in gambling and further extended to Pascal's wager. In the 18th century, Nicolas Bernoulli proposed the St. Petersburg Paradox in decision making, Daniel Bernoulli gave a solution and Laplace proposed a modification to the solution later on. In 1763, Bayes published the paper "An Essay Towards Solving a Problem in the Doctrine of Chances", which is the milestone of Bayesian statistics.

Robert Hooke worked on modeling human memory, which is a precursor of the study of memory.

=== Mathematics and psychology in the 19th century ===
The research developments in Germany and England in the 19th century made psychology a new academic subject. Since the German approach emphasized experiments in the investigation of the psychological processes that all humans share and the English approach was in the measurement of individual differences, the applications of mathematics were also different.

In Germany, Wilhelm Wundt established the first experimental psychology laboratory. The math in German psychology is mainly applied in sensory and psychophysics. Ernst Weber (1795–1878) created the first mathematical law of the mind, Weber's law, based on a variety of experiments. Gustav Fechner (1801–1887) contributed theories in sensations and perceptions and one of them is the Fechner's law, which modifies Weber's law.

Mathematical modeling has a long history in psychology starting in the 19th century with Ernst Weber (1795–1878) and Gustav Fechner (1801–1887) being among the first to apply functional equations to psychological processes. They thereby established the fields of experimental psychology in general, and that of psychophysics in particular.

Researchers in astronomy in the 19th century were mapping distances between stars by denoting the exact time of a star's passing of a cross-hair on a telescope. For lack of the automatic registration instruments of the modern era, these time measurements relied entirely on human response speed. It had been noted that there were small systematic differences in the times measured by different astronomers, and these were first systematically studied by German astronomer Friedrich Bessel (1782–1846). Bessel constructed personal equations from measurements of basic response speed that would cancel out individual differences from the astronomical calculations. Independently, physicist Hermann von Helmholtz measured reaction times to determine nerve conduction speed, developed resonance theory of hearing and the Young-Helmholtz theory of color vision.

These two lines of work came together in the research of Dutch physiologist F. C. Donders and his student J. J. de Jaager, who recognized the potential of reaction times for more or less objectively quantifying the amount of time elementary mental operations required. Donders envisioned the employment of his mental chronometry to scientifically infer the elements of complex cognitive activity by measurement of simple reaction time

Although there are developments in sensation and perception, Johann Herbart developed a system of mathematical theories in cognitive area to understand the mental process of consciousness.

The origin of English psychology can be traced to the theory of evolution by Darwin. But the emergence of English psychology is because of Francis Galton, who interested in individual differences between humans on psychological variables. The math in English psychology is mainly statistics and the work and methods of Galton is the foundation of psychometrics.

Galton introduced bivariate normal distribution in modeling the traits of the same individual, he also investigated measurement error and built his own model, and he also developed a stochastic branching process to examine the extinction of family names. There is also a tradition of the interest in studying intelligence in English psychology started from Galton. James McKeen Cattell and Alfred Binet developed tests of intelligence.

The first psychological laboratory was established in Germany by Wilhelm Wundt, who amply used Donders' ideas. However, findings that came from the laboratory were hard to replicate and this was soon attributed to the method of introspection that Wundt introduced. Some of the problems resulted from individual differences in response speed found by astronomers. Although Wundt did not seem to take interest in these individual variations and kept his focus on the study of the general human mind, Wundt's U.S. student James McKeen Cattell was fascinated by these differences and started to work on them during his stay in England.

The failure of Wundt's method of introspection led to the rise of different schools of thought. Wundt's laboratory was directed towards conscious human experience, in line with the work of Fechner and Weber on the intensity of stimuli. In the United Kingdom, under the influence of the anthropometric developments led by Francis Galton, interest focussed on individual differences between humans on psychological variables, in line with the work of Bessel. Cattell soon adopted the methods of Galton and helped laying the foundation of psychometrics.

=== 20th century ===
Many statistical methods were developed even before the 20th century: Charles Spearman invented factor analysis which studies individual differences by the variance and covariance. German psychology and English psychology have been combined and taken over by the United States. The statistical methods dominated the field during the beginning of the century. There are two important statistical developments: Structural Equation Modeling (SEM) and analysis of variance (ANOVA). Since factor analysis unable to make causal inferences, the method of structural equation modeling was developed by Sewall Wright to correlational data to infer causality, which is still a major research area today. Those statistical methods formed psychometrics. The Psychometric Society was established in 1935 and the journal Psychometrika was published since 1936.

In the United States, behaviorism arose in opposition to introspectionism and associated reaction-time research, and turned the focus of psychological research entirely to learning theory. In Europe introspection survived in Gestalt psychology. Behaviorism dominated American psychology until the end of the Second World War, and largely refrained from inference on mental processes. Formal theories were mostly absent (except for vision and hearing).

During the war, developments in engineering, mathematical logic and computability theory, computer science and mathematics, and the military need to understand human performance and limitations, brought together experimental psychologists, mathematicians, engineers, physicists, and economists. Out of this mix of different disciplines mathematical psychology arose. Especially the developments in signal processing, information theory, linear systems and filter theory, game theory, stochastic processes and mathematical logic gained a large influence on psychological thinking.

Two seminal papers on learning theory in Psychological Review helped to establish the field in a world that was still dominated by behaviorists: A paper by Bush and Mosteller instigated the linear operator approach to learning, and a paper by Estes that started the stimulus sampling tradition in psychological theorizing. These two papers presented the first detailed formal accounts of data from learning experiments.

Mathematical modeling of learning process were greatly developed in the 1950s as the behavioral learning theory was flourishing. One development is the stimulus sampling theory by Williams K. Estes, the other is linear operator models by Robert R. Bush, and Frederick Mosteller.

Signal processing and detection theory are broadly used in perception, psychophysics and nonsensory area of cognition. Von Neumann's book The Theory of Games and Economic Behavior establish the importance of game theory and decision making. R. Duncan Luce and Howard Raiffa contributed to the choice and decision making area.

The area of language and thinking comes into the spotlight with the development of computer science and linguistics, especially information theory and computation theory. Chomsky proposed the model of linguistics and computational hierarchy theory. Allen Newell and Herbert Simon proposed the model of human solving problems. The development in artificial intelligence and human computer interface are active areas in both computer science and psychology.

Before the 1950s, psychometricians emphasized the structure of measurement error and the development of high-power statistical methods to the measurement of psychological quantities but little of the psychometric work concerned the structure of the psychological quantities being measured or the cognitive factors behind the response data. Scott and Suppes studied relationship between the structure of data and the structure of numerical systems that represent the data. Coombs constructed formal cognitive models of the respondent in a measurement situation rather than statistical data processing algorithms, for example the unfolding model. Another breakthrough is the development of a new form of the psychophysical scaling function along with new methods of collecting psychophysical data, like Stevens' power law.

The 1950s saw a surge in mathematical theories of psychological processes, including Luce's theory of choice, Tanner and Swets' introduction of signal detection theory for human stimulus detection, and Miller's approach to information processing. By the end of the 1950s, the number of mathematical psychologists had increased from a handful by more than a tenfold, not counting psychometricians. Most of these were concentrated at the Indiana University, Michigan, Pennsylvania, and Stanford. Some of these were regularly invited by the U.S. Social Science Research Counsel to teach in summer workshops in mathematics for social scientists at Stanford University, promoting collaboration.

To better define the field of mathematical psychology, the mathematical models of the 1950s were brought together in sequence of volumes edited by Luce, Bush, and Galanter: Two readings and three handbooks. This series of volumes turned out to be helpful in the development of the field. In the summer of 1963 the need was felt for a journal for theoretical and mathematical studies in all areas in psychology, excluding work that was mainly factor analytical. An initiative led by R. C. Atkinson, R. R. Bush, W. K. Estes, R. D. Luce, and P. Suppes resulted in the appearance of the first issue of the Journal of Mathematical Psychology in January 1964.

Under the influence of developments in computer science, logic, and language theory, in the 1960s modeling gravitated towards computational mechanisms and devices. Examples of the latter constitute so called cognitive architectures (e.g., production rule systems, ACT-R) as well as connectionist systems or neural networks.

Important mathematical expressions for relations between physical characteristics of stimuli and subjective perception are Weber–Fechner law, Ekman's law, Stevens's power law, Thurstone's law of comparative judgment, the theory of signal detection (borrowed from radar engineering), the matching law, and Rescorla–Wagner rule for classical conditioning. While the first three laws are all deterministic in nature, later established relations are more fundamentally stochastic. This has been a general theme in the evolution in mathematical modeling of psychological processes: from deterministic relations as found in classical physics to inherently stochastic models.

== Influential mathematical psychologists ==
- John Anderson
- Richard C. Atkinson
- William H. Batchelder
- Michael H. Birnbaum
- Jerome Busemeyer
- Hans Colonius
- C. H. Coombs
- Robyn Dawes
- Adele Diederich
- Ehtibar Dzhafarov
- William Kaye Estes
- Jean-Claude Falmagne
- B. F. Green
- Daniel Kahneman
- Eric Maris
- Roger E. Kirk
- D. H. Krantz
- D. R. J. Laming
- Michael D. Lee
- Philip Marcus Levy
- R. Duncan Luce
- David Marr
- James L. McClelland
- Jeff Miller
- Jay Myung
- Louis Narens
- Allen Newell
- Robert M. Nosofsky
- Roger Ratcliff
- David E. Rumelhart
- Herbert A. Simon
- Roger Shepard
- Richard Shiffrin
- Philip L. Smith
- Stanley S. Stevens
- George Sperling
- Saul Sternberg
- Patrick Suppes
- John A. Swets
- Joshua Tenenbaum
- James T. Townsend
- Louis L. Thurstone
- Amos Tversky
- Rolf Ulrich
- Dirk Vorberg
- Eric-Jan Wagenmakers
- Elke U. Weber
- Thomas D. Wickens

== Important theories and models ==
=== Sensation, perception, and psychophysics ===
- Stevens' power law
- Weber–Fechner law

=== Stimulus detection and discrimination ===
- Signal detection theory

=== Stimulus identification ===
- Accumulator models
- Diffusion models
- Neural network/connectionist models
- Race models
- Random walk models
- Renewal models

=== Simple decision ===
- Cascade model
- Level and change race model
- Recruitment model
- SPRT
- Decision field theory

=== Memory scanning, visual search ===
- Push-down stack
- Serial exhaustive search (SES) model

=== Error response times ===
- Fast guess model

=== Sequential effects ===
- Linear operator model

=== Learning ===
- Linear operator model
- Stochastic learning theory

=== Measurement theory ===
- Theory of conjoint measurement

=== Developmental psychology ===
Developmental psychology is concerned not only with describing the characteristics of psychological change over time but also with explaining the principles and internal workings underlying these changes. Psychologists have attempted to better understand these factors by using models. A model must account for the means by which a process takes place. This is sometimes done in reference to changes in the brain that may correspond to changes in behavior over the course of development.

Mathematical modeling is useful in developmental psychology for implementing theory in a precise and easy-to-study manner, allowing generation, explanation, integration, and prediction of diverse phenomena. Several modeling techniques are applied to development: symbolic, connectionist (neural network), or dynamical systems models.

Dynamic systems models illustrate how many different features of a complex system may interact to yield emergent behaviors and abilities. Nonlinear dynamics has been applied to human systems specifically to address issues that require attention to temporality, such as life transitions, human development, and behavioral or emotional change over time. Nonlinear dynamic systems is currently being explored as a way to explain discrete phenomena of human development such as affect, second language acquisition, and locomotion.

== Journals and organizations ==
Central journals are the Journal of Mathematical Psychology, Computational Brain & Behavior, and the British Journal of Mathematical and Statistical Psychology. There are three annual conferences in the field, the annual meeting of the Society for Mathematical Psychology in the U.S., the annual European Mathematical Psychology Group meeting in Europe, and the Australasian Mathematical Psychology conference.

== See also ==
- Computational cognition
- Mathematical models of social learning
- Outline of psychology
- Psychological statistics
- Quantitative psychology
