= Philip Marcus Levy =

British psychologist (1934–2011)

- Born: Philip Marcus Levy; 1934; Redcar, Yorkshire, England
- Died: 2011 (aged 76–77)
- Education: University of Leeds; University of Birmingham
- Scientific career
- Fields: Psychology, mathematical psychology
- Workplaces: University of Lancaster
- Thesis: A study of interests: with particular reference to psychometric problems and methods (1960)

Philip Marcus Levy (1934 – 2011) was a British psychologist who specialised in the field of mathematical psychology.

== Life ==
Phil Levy was born in 1934 in Redcar, North Riding of Yorkshire but grew up in Leeds where he was a pupil at Leeds Grammar School. He took his first degree at the University of Leeds followed by a PhD on discriminant analysis at the University of Birmingham (1960). He stayed at Birmingham, initially as a research fellow and then as lecturer and senior lecturer. He was appointed the first chair in psychology at the University of Lancaster in 1972.

He was active in the British Psychological Society and edited the British Journal of Mathematical and Statistical Psychology. He was elected president of the society in 1978. In his presidential address he called on psychologists to reflect on the assumptions underlying the science. As he said: I feel that we have a simplified view of science, perhaps due - for understandable sociohistorical reasons - for our anxious desire to receive the accolade of being 'scientific' [...] I believe that science is much more a matter of social exchange than many of us are prepared to admit.

== Work ==
His expertise was in mathematical and statistical psychology. He was an expert in the construction of tests in education and training.

== Awards ==
- 1977-1978 - President, British Psychological Society
