= Jerome Busemeyer =

Professor at Indiana University Bloomington

Jerome R. Busemeyer
- Born: 1950 (age 75–76); Cincinnati, Ohio, U.S.
- Education: University of Cincinnati; University of South Carolina
- Known for: Decision field theory Quantum cognition
- Spouse: Meijuan Lu
- Scientific career
- Fields: Cognitive Psychology; Mathematical Psychology
- Workplaces: Purdue University; Indiana University Bloomington
- Thesis: The Combined Effects of Event Patterns and Payoffs on Choice Behavior in a Sequential Decision Making Task (1979)
- Doctoral advisor: Thomas Cafferty

Jerome Robert Busemeyer is a distinguished professor at Indiana University Bloomington in the Department of Psychological & Brain Sciences and Cognitive Science Program.

Busemeyer completed his undergraduate degree in psychology at the University of Cincinnati in 1973, which he followed with both a master's and Ph.D. in experimental psychology from the University of South Carolina in 1976 and 1979 respectively. He was a NIMH postdoctoral fellow in the Quantitative program at University of Illinois until 1980. Afterwards, he became a faculty member at Purdue University until 1997, and then he joined the faculty at Indiana University-Bloomington. He was president of the Society for Mathematical Psychology in 1993, and he also served as the Manager of the Cognition and Decision Program at the Air Force Office of Scientific Research in 2005–2007. He was chief editor of Journal of Mathematical Psychology from 2005 to 2010, and he is the inaugural editor of the APA journal Decision.

== Research ==
His research investigates the cognitive processes and dynamics of human judgment and decision making using mathematical modeling. He is one of the developers of a theory of decision making called decision field theory. He is also one of the developers of the field of quantum cognition. He has authored several books and hundreds of articles over the course of his career.

== Personal History ==
Jerome Busemeyer was born in Cincinnati, Ohio, in the year 1950. He attended Moeller High School. He married a Traditional Doctor of Chinese Medicine named Meijuan Lu. He has two sons, James and Brian, and a step son Sheng Yi. His father was Robert H. Busemeyer, who was a well known electrical contractor in Cincinnati.

== Awards ==
- Honorary Doctorate of the university of Basel in Psychology, 2019
- Distinguished Professor Indiana University, 2017
- Fellow of American Academy of Arts and Sciences, 2017
- Fellow Cognitive Science Society, 2017
- Society of Experimental Psychologists Howard C. Warren medal, 2015
- Fellow of the Society of Experimental Psychologists, 2006
