= James Townsend (psychologist) =

James Tarlton Townsend
- Born: July 9, 1939 (age 87)
- Education: California State University, Fresno, Stanford University
- Known for: Decision field theory Systems Factorial Technology; General Recognition Theory
- Scientific career
- Fields: cognitive psychology, mathematical psychology
- Workplaces: University of Hawaiʻi, Purdue University, Indiana University
- Doctoral advisor: Richard C. Atkinson
- Doctoral students: F. Gregory Ashby

James Tarlton Townsend is a Distinguished Rudy Professor of Psychology at Indiana University, Bloomington. He is known for his work in mathematical psychology, particularly in distinguishing parallel and serial processing and for models of perception.

== Education and career ==
Townsend received an A.B. in Psychology from Fresno State College in 1961. In 1962, he began his graduate work under Richard Atkinson at the Institute for Mathematical Studies in the Social Sciences at Stanford University. After completing his Ph.D. in psychology in 1966, Townsend joined the faculty at the Department of Psychology at the University of Hawaii. Two years later, in 1968, Townsend moved to Purdue University where he received tenure in 1971 and became a full professor in 1977. During that period, Townsend spent time as a visiting associate professor in William Kaye Estes’s lab at Rockefeller University (1972–1973), a visiting scholar at the Institut für Psychologie at the Technische Universität, Braunschweig, a visiting scholar in the School of Social Sciences at the University of California, Irvine (1982), and as a visiting professor in the Department of Psychology at Stanford University (1986). In 1989, Townsend became a Rudy Professor in the Department of Psychology at Indiana University. Townsend became a Distinguished Professor in 2008.

== Research ==
Townsend's major theoretical contributions include Systems Factorial Technology, General Recognition Theory and Decision field theory.

Townsend coauthored an influential book on modeling in psychology with F. Gregory Ashby, The Stochastic Modeling of Elementary Psychological Processes. He has also edited multiple volumes on mathematical psychology.

In 1985 and again in 2004, Townsend served as the president of the Society for Mathematical Psychology and has more recently served as the president of the Configural Processing Consortium. He served as editor of the Journal of Mathematical Psychology from 1985 to 1989.

== Awards ==
- Lifetime Achievement Award from the Society of Mathematical Psychology, 2020
- Norman Anderson Lifetime Achievement Award from the Society of Experimental Psychologists, 2007
- Fellow of the American Psychological Association, 2004
- Fellow of the American Psychological Society, 1998
