= Wagenmakers =

Wagenmakers is a surname. Notable people with this surname include:

- Eric-Jan Wagenmakers (born 1972), Dutch psychologist
- Linda Wagenmakers (born 1975), Dutch singer and voice actress
