= Robyn Dawes =

American psychologist (1936–2010)

- Born: Robyn Mason Dawes; 23 July 1936
- Died: 14 December 2010 (aged 74)
- Education: Harvard University (BA), University of Michigan (M. Psych, PhD)
- Known for: Judgment & Decision-Making, Clinical v. Statistical Prediction
- Awards: American Academy of Arts and Sciences (Fellow), American Statistical Association (Fellow), APA William James Award
- Scientific career
- Fields: Mathematical Psychology Clinical Psychology
- Workplaces: Carnegie Mellon University

Robyn Mason Dawes (July 23, 1936 – December 14, 2010) was an American psychologist who specialized in the field of human judgment. His research interests included human irrationality, human cooperation, intuitive expertise, and the United States AIDS policy. He applied linear models to human decision making, including models with equal weights, a method known as unit-weighted regression. He co-wrote an early textbook on mathematical psychology alongside Clyde Coombs and Amos Tversky (see below).

== Early life and education ==
Dawes grew up in Pittsburgh. He earned his B.A. in Philosophy at Harvard (1958) and his Master’s in Clinical Psychology (1960) at the University of Michigan before earning his Doctorate in Mathematical Psychology (1963) at the same institution.

== Career ==
Dawes held jobs at the University of Oregon, where he served as Department Head for five years, as well as the Oregon Research Institute.

In 1985, Dawes joined the Department of Social and Decision Sciences (SDS) at Carnegie Mellon University where he served as Department Head for six years eventually becoming the Charles J. Queenan, Jr. University Professor of Psychology. He was a fellow in the American Academy of Arts and Sciences and a member of the National Research Council's Committee on AIDS Research.

In 1990, he was awarded the William James Award by the American Psychological Association for the book Rational Choice in an Uncertain World, now in its 2nd Edition, which he co-wrote with Reid Hastie.

In 1994, Dawes wrote a book called House of Cards in which he criticised unsupported methods and theories employed in psychological practice. Examples include holistic judgment, the Rorschach test, and anatomically correct doll.

In 2006, Dawes was elected a Fellow of the American Statistical Association "for creative research on statistics and rational decision-making, contributions to the application of cognitive psychology to survey research, and promotion of careful statistical thinking in psychology and behavioral research." He was a member of the American Psychological Association Ethics Committee.

== Books ==
- Hastie, Reid; Robyn Dawes (2010). Rational Choice in an Uncertain World: The Psychology of Judgment and Decision Making. Sage Publications, Inc. ISBN 978-1-4129-5903-2.
- Dawes, Robyn (2001). Everyday Irrationality: How Pseudo-Scientists, Lunatics, and the Rest of Us Systematically Fail to Think Rationally. Westview Press. ISBN 0-8133-6552-X.
- Dawes, Robyn (1994). House of Cards: Psychology and Psychotherapy Built on Myth. Free Press.
- Dawes, Robyn (1988), Rational Choice in an Uncertain World. Orlando, Florida: Harcourt Brace Jovanovich.
- Dawes, Robyn (1974). The Fundamentals of Attitude Measurement. John Wiley & Sons.
- Dawes, Robyn (1970). Mathematical Psychology: An Elementary Introduction (with Clyde Coombs and Amos Tversky). Prentice Hall.

== Selected publications ==
- Dana, J., & Dawes, R. M. (2004). The superiority of simple alternatives to regression for social science predictions. Journal of Educational and Behavioral Statistics, volume 29(3), pages 317-331.
- Dawes, R. M. (1962). A note on base rates and psychometric efficiency. Journal of Consulting Psychology, volume 26(5), pages 422-424.
- Dawes, R. M. (1976). Shallow psychology. In J. S. Carroll & J. W. Payne (Eds.), Cognition and social behavior (pages 3–12). Hillsdale, NJ: Lawrence Erlbaum.
- Dawes, R. M. (1980). Social dilemmas. Annual Review of Psychology, volume 31, pages 169-193.
- Dawes, R. M., Faust, D., Meehl, P. E. (1989). Clinical versus actuarial judgment. Science, volume 243(4899), pages 1668-1674. doi: 10.1126/science.2648573.
- Howard, J. W., & Dawes, R. M. (1976). Linear prediction of marital happiness. Personality and Social Psychology Bulletin, volume 2(4), pages 478-480.
- Swets, J. A., Dawes, R. M., & Monahan, J. (2000, October). Better decisions through science. Scientific American, pages 82–87.
