= European Mathematical Psychology Group =

European academic organization

The European Mathematical Psychology Group (EMPG) is an informal association of scientists in mathematical psychology. The group was founded in 1971 in Paris; it has not been formally organized as a society, although has been described as the "European branch" of the Society for Mathematical Psychology. It holds a meeting each year in a European city, and beginning at the 23rd meeting, has published a proceedings from that meeting as an edited volume. As of 2001, there were approximately 100 attendees.
