= Clyde Coombs =

American psychologist (1912–1988)

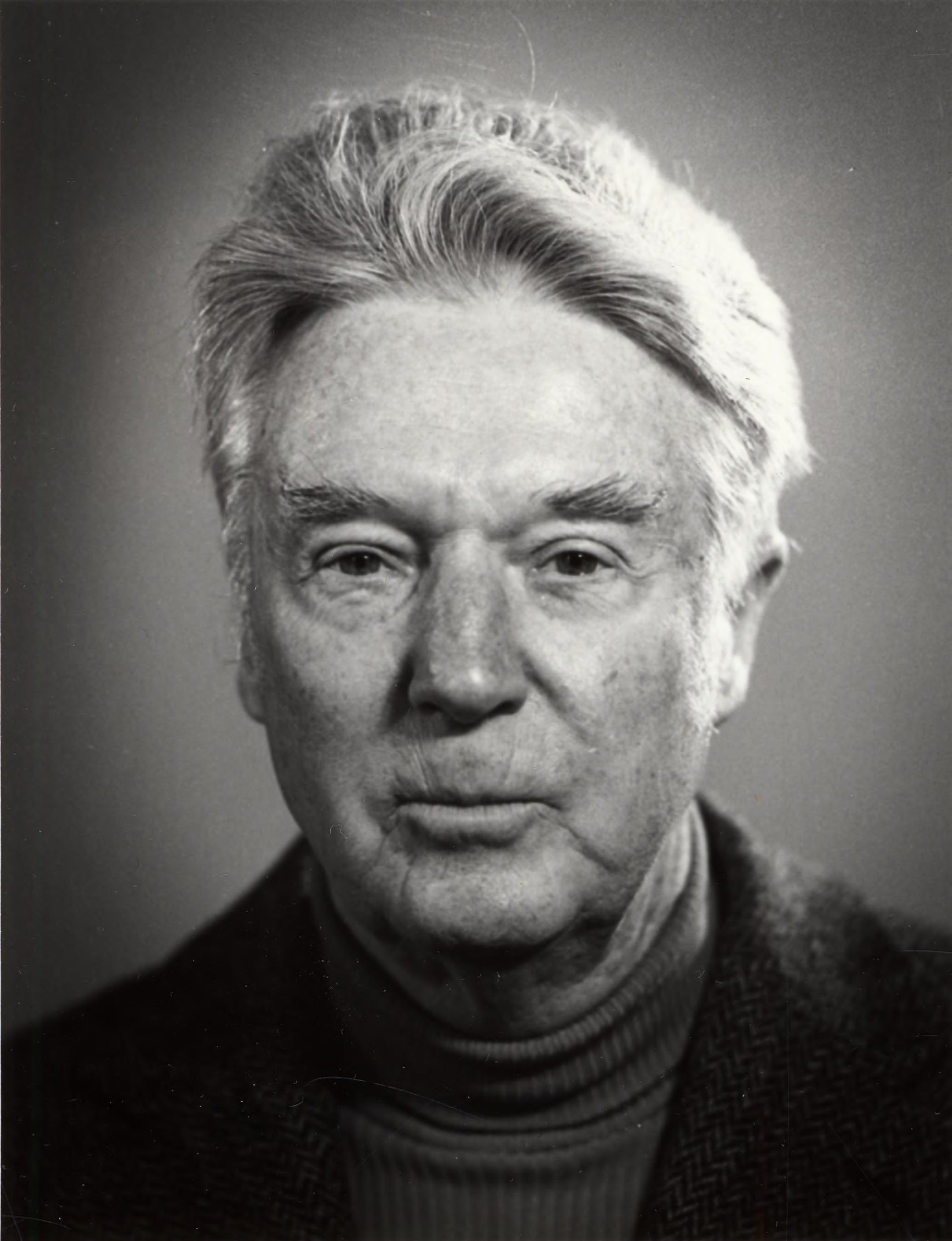
University of Michigan faculty portrait of Coombs

Clyde Hamilton Coombs (July 22, 1912 – February 4, 1988) was an American psychologist specializing in the field of mathematical psychology. He devised a voting system, that was hence named Coombs' method.

== Education and career ==
Coombs was born in New Jersey but spent most of his childhood in California. He studied at Santa Barbara State College (later University of California, Santa Barbara), the continued his PhD at the University of California, Berkeley.

Coombs founded the Mathematical Psychology program at the University of Michigan. His students included Amos Tversky, Robyn Dawes, and Baruch Fischhoff, all important researchers in Decision Sciences. The classic text "An Introduction to Mathematical Psychology," by Coombs, Robyn Dawes, and Amos Tversky was a must for Michigan graduate students in Mathematical and Experimental Psychology.

== Honors and awards ==
In 1959, Coombs was elected as a Fellow of the American Statistical Association.

The development of scaling theory by Louis Guttman and Clyde Coombs has been recognized by Science as one of 62 major advances in the social sciences in the period 1900–1965

== Bibliography ==
=== Books ===
- Coombs, Clyde H.; Thrall, Robert M.; Raiffa, Howard, eds. (1954). Decision processes. New York: Wiley. OCLC 639321.
- Coombs, Clyde Hamilton (1967). A Theory of Data. John Wiley & Sons.
- Coombs, Clyde H.; Dawes, Robyn M.; Tversky, Amos (1970). Mathematical psychology: an elementary introduction. Prentice-Hall series in mathematical psychology. Englewood Cliffs, N.J: Prentice-Hall. ISBN 978-0-13-562157-8.
- Coombs, Clyde H. (1976). A theory of psychological scaling. Westport, Conn: Greenwood Press. ISBN 978-0-8371-8646-7.
- Coombs, Clyde H. (1983). Psychology and mathematics: an essay on theory. Ann Arbor: University of Michigan Press. ISBN 978-0-472-10034-7.
- Coombs, Clyde H.; Avrunin, George S. (1988). The structure of conflict. Hillsdale, N.J: L. Erlbaum Associates. ISBN 978-0-8058-0011-1.

=== Selected publications ===
- Coombs, C. H. (1960). "A theory of data". Psychological Review. 67 (3): 143–159. doi:10.1037/h0047773. ISSN 1939-1471.
- Coombs, Clyde H. (1974). "Psychological Scaling without a unit of Measurement". Taylor & Francis. doi:10.4324/9781315128948-29/psychological-scaling-without-unit-measurement-coombs. Archived from the original on July 10, 2024.
- Coombs, Clyde H., Coombs, Lolagene C. & Lingoes, James C. (1978). Stochastic cumulative scales. In S. Shye (Ed.) Theory construction and data analysis in the behavioral sciences. San Francisco: Jossey-Bass.
