= British Journal of Mathematical and Statistical Psychology =

- Discipline: psychology, statistics, mathematical psychology
- Language: English
- Edited by: Ying (Alison) Cheng

Publication details
- Former name(s): British Journal of Psychology (Statistical Section); British Journal of Statistical Psychology
- History: 1947–present
- Publisher: Wiley-Blackwell and the British Psychological Society (England)
- Frequency: Triannual
- Impact factor: 1.930 (2018)

Standard abbreviations
- ISO 4: Br. J. Math. Stat. Psychol.

Indexing
- CODEN: BJMSAK
- ISSN: 0007-1102 (print); 2044-8317 (web)
- LCCN: 50013756
- OCLC no.: 6010380

Links
- Journal homepage; Online access

The British Journal of Mathematical and Statistical Psychology is a British scientific journal founded in 1947. It covers the fields of psychology, statistics, and mathematical psychology. It was established as the British Journal of Psychology (Statistical Section), was renamed the British Journal of Statistical Psychology in 1953, and was renamed again to its current title in 1965.

== Abstracting and indexing ==
The journal is indexed in Current Index to Statistics, PsycINFO, Social Sciences Citation Index, Current Contents / Social & Behavioral Sciences, Science Citation Index Expanded, and Scopus.

== Past Editors ==
Thom Baguley

Matthias von Davier
