= Large-scale learning assessments =

Large-scale learning assessments (LSLAs) is defined as a form of national or cross-national standardized testing that provide a snapshot of learning achievement for a group of learners in a given year and in a limited number of learning domains.

The use of these assessments have been increasing around the globe and have also broadened in scope. LSLAs go beyond measuring reading and mathematics, and target a greater number of domains, including digital skills, computer and information literacy, socio-emotional skills, or the understanding of concepts and issues related to civics and citizenship.

Total spending and distribution of total spending on education, by country income group and financing source

LSLAs have gained central debates education at both local and global levels. This was encouraged by emphasis on equitable, effective and relevant learning for all inherent to the 2030 Agenda for Sustainable Development and the focus on using data to improve policies and strategies. LSLAs are incorporated into the work programmes of international and regional organizations, and are supported by donor agencies through financial and technical assistance.

== Principles and implementations ==
LSLAs are a specific subset of learning assessment systems. They are system-level assessments that provide information of learning achievement for a given group of learners (based on age or grade) in a given year and in a limited number of domains. They are often categorized as national or cross-national (regional/international) assessments.

LSLAs are uniform and standardized in content, administration process, timing and scoring. They are frequently referred to as standardized tests, particularly within Anglo-Saxon countries and literature. They are generally sample-based, but over the last decades, some countries have adopted a census-based approach. They can be school or household-based, curriculum-based or not.

LSLAs are generally used by education authorities to determine learners’ overall achievement levels. They help governments monitor changes in learning outcomes over time and highlight inequalities in learning achievement among population groups. By identifying correlates of learning outcomes and by providing a deeper insight on how a range of variables interact, LSLA data also provide better understanding of the dynamics behind the performance of education systems. They inform the design of policies and strategies aimed at improving student knowledge and competences as well as equity in learning.

LSLAs are designed and implemented to meet a certain level of standards. Despite there being no vetted international standard for the characteristics that define robust LSLAs (i.e. that yield reliable data), there is agreement among test developers, statisticians and psychometricians on the technical requirements of such assessments.

LSLAs are developed and implemented based on at least three principles:

1. Technically sound. They are assessment methodologies, analysis and interpretation of data that follow scientific principles;
2. Following standardized field operations;
3. Designed to be ethical, fair and inclusive of the target population.

== Perceived benefits ==
Developing a national learning assessment or participating in cross-national initiatives are multiple and driven by interconnected factors.

Four main factors that enhance the use of LSLAs are: the growing number of perceived benefits, an evolving global culture of evaluation, a shift in the focus of global education policy, and priorities and demands of development donors.

=== Data analysis ===
Data from LSLAs give governments evidence to address system inefficiencies by providing answers to key questions, such as who is learning what and who is not, where, when and why. Learning achievement scores and information from the background questionnaires are generally used by experts and researchers to describe the knowledge and skills of a target population. This involves several types of analyses. First, understanding the factors that influence learning achievement (e.g. home and school context and practices), and if these are changing over time. Second, identifying general trends in learning achievements and evaluating progress towards specific targets using a set of indicators. Third, highlighting disparities in cognitive abilities among sub-populations of learners by relevant dimension, including socio-economic, regional, gender, migration status and mother tongue.

Policy-makers use the results or evidence from LSLAs for many purposes including:

- Monitoring and evaluation: to monitor a set of issues and trends towards national, regional or global goals and targets; and to evaluate education policies.
- Inform policy formulation: to orient policy formulation, design and implementation or improve the effectiveness of policy measures already in place.
- Agenda setting: to set agendas by raising awareness on certain issues, stimulating debate within civil society and government circles, identifying priority issues for reform and generating ‘positive pressure’ to incite governments to undertake reforms or advance policy change.
- Accountability: to hold a range of agents accountable, including immediate education stakeholders (administrators, principals, teachers, school boards, private providers).
- In-depth analysis: to add depth and perspective to the analysis of education systems, and direct policy-makers and practitioners to focused studies that reflect their local and contextual realities.

== Limitations ==
LSLAs generally focus on a limited range of learning dimensions and address a defined number of the multiple purposes of education. It may not measure other variables such as classroom and school settings. According to a 2019 UNESCO publication three main limitations arise: its under-use, over-use and the combination with (or subordinate to) accountability measures.

== See also ==
- Educational assessment
- Standardized test

== Sources ==
This article incorporates text from a free content work. Licensed under CC BY-SA 3.0 IGO. Text taken from The promise of large-scale learning assessments: acknowledging limits to unlock opportunities, UNESCO, UNESCO. UNESCO.
