= Stephen Sireci =

American psychometrician

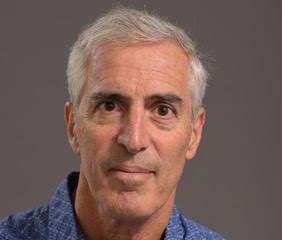
- Education: Loyola College; Fordham University
- Scientific career
- Fields: Psychometrics educational assessment
- Workplaces: University of Massachusetts Amherst

Stephen G. Sireci is a psychometrician and academic. He is a Distinguished University Professor in the College of Education and Director of the Center for Educational Assessment at the University of Massachusetts Amherst.

He has primarily conducted research in educational test development and evaluation, specifically focusing on the issues related to validity, cross-lingual assessment, standard setting, and computer-based testing, and is the co-architect of the multistage-adaptive Massachusetts Adult Proficiency Tests.

He is a Fellow of the American Educational Research Association and Division 5 of the American Psychological Association and former President of both the International Test Commission and the National Council on Measurement in Education.

== Education ==
Sireci earned both his bachelor's and master's degrees in Psychology from Loyola College in Baltimore, MD. Subsequently, he pursued his doctoral studies in Psychology, achieving a Ph.D. with a specialization in Psychometrics from Fordham University. In 1990, he briefly worked as a predoctoral fellow for Educational Testing Service.

== Career ==
He served as a Research Supervisor of Testing for the Newark Board of Education in 1989. He was appointed as a Psychometrician for the American Institute of Certified Public Accountants in August 1990 where he handled activities related to the Uniform CPA Examination.

In June 1992, he held an appointment as a Senior Psychometrician for the GED Testing Service of the American Council on Education. He also served as the President of the Northeastern Educational Research Association (NERA) from 2006 to 2007 and worked as the vice president for the Board of Directors of National Council on Measurement in Education for three years. In addition, he has served on numerous advisory boards throughout his career, and has been a member of the Puerto Rico and Texas Technical Advisory Committees since 2004, while also serving as a member of the New England Comprehensive Assessment Program. He also holds of has held membership in Technical Advisory Committees for Educational Records Bureau, HumRRO, Centre for Educational Measurement Oslo, Maryland, New York State Blue Ribbon Commission on Graduation Measures and lifetime member of the National Academy of Education.

Sireci has been holding an appointment as a Distinguished University Professor in the College of Education at the University of Massachusetts Amherst since 1995, and has also served as a professor extraordinary for the Department of Industrial Psychology at Stellenbosch University in South Africa.

== Research ==
Sireci's research focus centers on educational assessment, with an emphasis on test fairness and construction, equity-centered testing policies, cross-lingual assessment, technology-enhanced assessment, and content validity.

He has published journal articles and book chapters on the educational metrics, validity theory, test bias, cross-lingual assessments, standard setting, and computer-based testing.

In collaboration with Ronald Hambleton, April Zenisky, and others, Sireci developed an adaptive test called the Massachusetts Adult Proficiency Tests (MAPT) to assess adults student's reading and math knowledge and skills and evaluate their progress in achieving educational goals. He also is co-architect of the Adult Skills Assessment Program. In 1991, with Howard Wainer and David Thissen, he published a paper on how to avoid considerable biases when estimating the reliability of a testlet-based test by demonstrating that typical reliabilities overestimated test score reliability due to local item dependence.

== Selected bibliography ==
=== Books ===
- Sireci, S.G; Tucker, E.M; Gordon, E.W (2025). Handbook for Assessment in the Service of Learning, Volume II: Reconceptualizing Assessment to Improve Learning. University of Massachusetts Amherst Libraries. ISBN 978-1-945764-34-9.

=== Selected articles ===
- Sireci, Stephen G.; Thissen, David; Wainer, Howard (September 1991). "On the Reliability of Testlet‐Based Tests". Journal of Educational Measurement. 28 (3): 237–247. doi:10.1111/j.1745-3984.1991.tb00356.x. ISSN 0022-0655.
- Sireci, S. G.; Geisinger, K. F. (1995). "Using Subject-Matter Experts to Assess Content Representation: An MDS Analysis". Applied Psychological Measurement. 19 ((3)): 241–255. doi:10.1177/014662169501900303.
- Sireci, Stephen G. (1 November 1998). "The Construct of Content Validity". Social Indicators Research. 45 (1): 83–117. doi:10.1023/A:1006985528729. ISSN 1573-0921.
