= American Journal of Evaluation =

- Discipline: Evaluation, research methods
- Language: English
- Edited by: Jori N. Hall & Laura R. Peck

Publication details
- Former names: Evaluation News, Evaluation Practice
- History: 1981–present
- Publisher: SAGE Publications (United States)
- Frequency: Quarterly
- Impact factor: 1.339 (2017)

Standard abbreviations
- ISO 4: Am. J. Eval.

Indexing
- ISSN: 1098-2140 (print); 1557-0878 (web)
- LCCN: 98660819
- OCLC no.: 38534330

Links
- Journal homepage; Online access; Online archive

The American Journal of Evaluation is a peer-reviewed academic journal that covers research on methods of evaluation. It is a quarterly journal and its first publication was in 1981. The co-editors-in-chief are Jori N. Hall and Laura R. Peck.

The American Evaluation Association is a professional association where students, funders, managers, practitioners, faculty and government decision-makers can discuss the field of evaluation. The American Journal of Evaluation is one of the two official journals of the association and a premier evaluation journal globally. The American Journal of Evaluation is published by SAGE Publications.

== History ==
The American Journal of Evaluation was for the first time published in February 1981. Its first article was called "News of the network". This first journal was composed of 25 articles and had approximately 100 pages.

SAGE Publications assumed publication of the journal in 2005. SAGE Publications decided, in 2005, to put an online version of the journal. All articles from 2005 on are available online and accessible to everyone on their official website.

== SAGE Publications ==
SAGE Publishing is an independent company which was created by Sara Miller McCune and Georges D. McDune in 1965. It has published more than 800 journals and 800 books including the American Journal of Evaluation. SAGE Publications is a worldwide company which has more than 1,500 employees mostly based in Los Angeles, London, New Delhi, Singapore and Washington, D.C.

It is a leading independent publisher since 1965 about scholarship and research. Its goal is to disseminate research teaching on a global scale and educate future generations. It began as a social sciences publisher because they believed in the importance of that discipline. They have expanded their topics into engineering and medicine, but most of people know SAGE Publications as the social sciences publisher in the world.

They are different from the other publishers as their belief is that research methods are not just something that schools around the world do but actually need to be informed about. Being an independent company is their main power; they always have a long-term view and can build sustainably for the future. SAGE Publications grows by taking risks such as making research and discourse analysis about the African phenomena. They are always trying to be visionaries in order to improve their quality of research.

== Purpose ==
The American Journal of Evaluation features broad, multidisciplinary perspectives on issues in the field of evaluation as relevant to education, public administration, behavioral sciences, human services, health sciences, sociology, criminology and other disciplines and professional practice fields. More Than 25 Years of the American Journal of Evaluation: The Recollections of Past Editors in Their Own Words.

The American Journal of Evaluation has various article types and sections. The sections include Book Review; Economic Evaluation; Ethics, Values & Culture; Experimental Methodology; International Developments in Evaluation; Method Note; and Teaching & Learning of Evaluation.

== Abstracting and indexing ==
According to the Journal Citation Reports, for its first year of publication, in 2009, the American Journal of Evaluation had an impact factor of 0.942. It reached 1.16 in 2011 whereas in 201 the journal was ranking 33 out of 98 journals in the category "Social Sciences, Interdisciplinary" with an impact factor of 0.965. Recent figures show that the impact factor was reaching 1.339 in 2017. The impact factor is a measure of the frequency with which the "average article" in a journal has been cited in a particular year or period.
