= Eric-Jan Wagenmakers =

Dutch mathematical psychologist

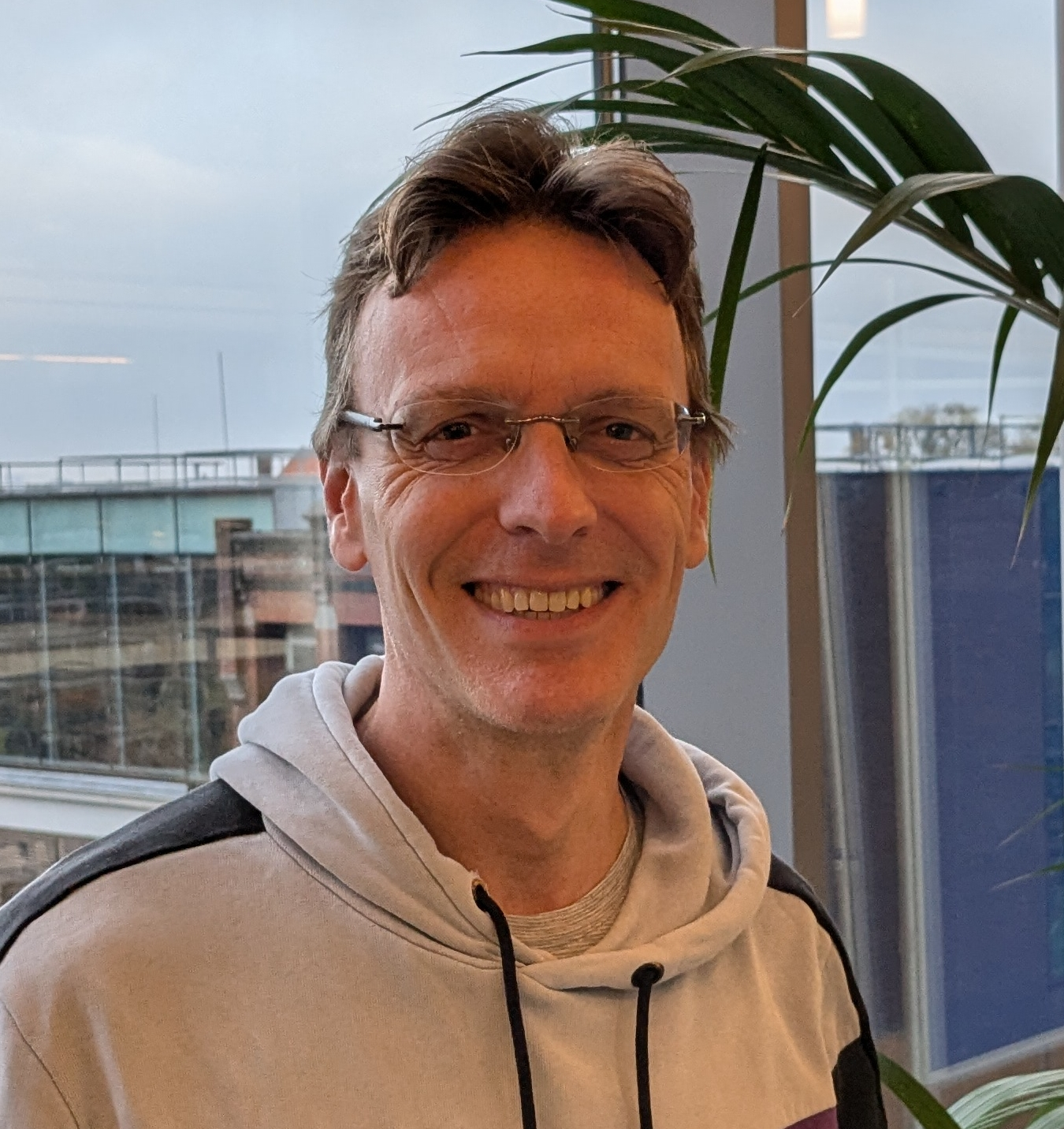
- Born: May 21, 1972 (age 53); Baarland, Netherlands
- Other names: E.J. Wagenmakers
- Citizenship: Netherlands
- Education: University of Groningen; University of Amsterdam
- Known for: Bayesian statistics
- Spouse: Nataschja Hummel
- Children: Theo (2016) and Leanne (2019)
- Awards: Fellow of the Association for Psychological Science since 2017; Member of the Psychonomic Society
- Scientific career
- Fields: Mathematical psychology
- Institutions: University of Amsterdam (2003–present)
- Academic advisors: Jeroen Raaijmakers

Eric-Jan Wagenmakers (born May 21, 1972) is a Dutch mathematical psychologist. He is a professor at the Methodology Unit in the Department of Psychology at the University of Amsterdam (UvA). Since 2012, he has also been Professor of Neurocognitive Modeling: Interdisciplinary Integration at UvA's Faculty of Social and Behavioral Sciences. A noted expert on research methods in psychology, he has been highly critical of some dubious practices by his fellow psychologists, including Daryl Bem's research purporting to find support for the parapsychological concept of extrasensory perception, and the tendency for psychologists in general to favor the publication of studies with surprising, eye-catching results. He has also been actively addressing the replication crisis in psychology by helping to conduct a series of studies aimed at reproducing a 1988 study on the supposed effects of smiling on the perceived funniness of cartoons. František Bartoš, Dr Wagenmakers, Alexandra Sarafoglou, Henrik Godmann, and many colleagues were awarded the 2024 Ig Nobel Probability Prize for "showing, both in theory and by 350,757 experiments, that when you flip a coin, it tends to land on the same side as it started."
