= Current Index to Statistics =

Periodical literature

- Producer: The Institute of Mathematical Statistics & the American Statistical Association (USA)
- Languages: English

Access
- Providers: Current Index to Statistics
- Cost: Subscription

Coverage
- Disciplines: Statistics
- Record depth: Index, abstracts
- Format coverage: Academic journal articles, books
- Temporal coverage: 1975–2019. Limited pre-1975 material.
- Update frequency: Annually

Links
- Website: www.statindex.org
- Title list(s): www.statindex.org/CIS/ReleaseInfo/info.html

The Current Index to Statistics was an online database published by the Institute of Mathematical Statistics and the American Statistical Association that contained bibliographic data of articles in statistics, probability, and related fields. It was shut down at the end of 2019.

== See also ==
- Web of Science
- IEEE Xplore
