= Journal of Mathematical Psychology =

- Discipline: Mathematical psychology, theoretical psychology
- Language: English
- Edited by: Adele Diederich

Publication details
- History: 1964–present
- Publisher: Elsevier
- Frequency: Bimonthly
- Impact factor: 2.176 (2017)

Standard abbreviations
- ISO 4: J. Math. Psychol.
- MathSciNet: J. Math. Psych.

Indexing
- CODEN: JMTPAJ
- ISSN: 0022-2496
- OCLC no.: 01783082

Links
- Journal homepage; Journal page at publisher's website; Online access

The Journal of Mathematical Psychology is a peer-reviewed scientific journal established in 1964. It covers all areas of mathematical and theoretical psychology, including sensation and perception, psychophysics, learning and memory, problem solving, judgment and decision-making, and motivation. It is the official journal of the Society for Mathematical Psychology and is published on their behalf by Elsevier.

== Abstracting and indexing ==
The journal is abstracted and indexed by:

- ACM Guide to Computing Literature
- Biological Abstracts
- CompuMath Citation Index
- Computing Reviews
- Current Contents/Social & Behavioral Sciences
- Current Index to Statistics
- Mathematical Reviews
- PsycINFO/Psychological Abstracts
- Scopus
- Social Sciences Citation Index

According to the Journal Citation Reports, the journal has a 2017 impact factor of 2.176.
