= Louis Narens =

Louis Narens (died October 5, 2022) was the Graduate Director of Mathematical Behavioral Science, Professor in the Department of Cognitive Sciences and the Department of Logic and the Philosophy of Science at the University of California, Irvine.

He was one of the major exponents of measurement theory in mathematical psychology.

== Bibliography ==
- Abstract Measurement Theory. (1985) The MIT Press, ISBN 978-0262140379.
- Theories of Meaningfulness. (2002) Lawrence Erlbaum Associates, ISBN 978-0805840452.
- Introduction to the Theories of Measurement and Meaningfulness and the Use of Invariance in Science. (2007) Lawrence Erlbaum Associates, ISBN 978-0805862027.
- Theories of Probability: An Examination of Logical and Qualitative Foundations, (2007) World Scientific Publishing Company, ISBN 978-9812708014.

== See also ==
- American philosophy
- List of American philosophers
