= William Kaye Estes =

American psychologist (1919–2011)

- Born: June 17, 1919; Minneapolis, Minnesota, US
- Died: August 17, 2011 (aged 92)
- Education: University of Minnesota
- Known for: Stimulus sampling theory, Mathematical Psychology
- Scientific career
- Fields: Psychology; Mathematical Psychology; Cognitive Psychology
- Thesis: An Experimental Study of Punishment (1943)
- Doctoral advisor: B. F. Skinner

William Kaye Estes (June 17, 1919 – August 17, 2011) was an American psychologist. A Review of General Psychology survey, published in 2002, ranked Estes as the 77th most cited psychologist of the 20th century. In order to develop a statistical explanation for the learning phenomena, William Kaye Estes developed the Stimulus Sampling Theory in 1950 which suggested that a stimulus-response association is learned by a single trial; however, the learning process is continuous and consists of the accumulation of distinct stimulus-response pairings.

== Background and education ==
As an undergraduate, Estes was a student of Richard M. Elliott at the University of Minnesota. As a graduate student he attended the University of Minnesota, and worked for B. F. Skinner, with whom he developed the conditioned suppression paradigm (Estes & Skinner, 1941).

After receiving his doctorate, Estes joined Skinner on the faculty of Indiana University. After Estes got out of the U. S. Army at the end of World War II, he established a reputation as one of the originators of mathematical learning theory. Estes transferred from Indiana University to Stanford University, to Rockefeller University in New York, and finally to Harvard University. While teaching at Harvard University, Estes contributed as an instituting first editor of the publication Psychological Science for the Association for Psychological Science. He was also editor of the journal Psychological Review from 1977 to 1982

After retiring from Harvard, Estes returned to Bloomington, Indiana, where he remained active in academics to become professor emeritus at his original academic home department.

One of Estes' most famous contributions to learning theory was stimulus-sampling theory, which conceives of learning as establishing associations to hypothetical stimulus elements that are drawn randomly from a pool of elements that characterize a particular learning situation. This theory predicted probability matching, which has been found in a wide range of tasks for many different organisms.

Estes has had a major influence on theories of learning and memory, both in his own and in the theories of his many students and collaborators. In honor of his influence, Estes received the National Medal of Science on December 16, 1997, from President Bill Clinton.

== Estes on education ==
Estes proposed a model of learning that he termed Stimulus Sampling Theory (SST). SST is a probabilistic model that provides a statistical explanation of how a stimulus-response association is learned in a single trial, but requires more stimulus-response repetitions to build an evident unit of learning. Stimulus-sampling models aid at least two functions. One is to make experimental predictions for situations in which the stimulus elements are controlled, in part at least, by the experimenter. The stimulus-sampling theory also aids as a heuristic device for discovering effective truisms about changes in response probabilities. The general theory of stimulus-sampling assumes the existence of a population of discrete stimulus elements and hypothesizes that an entity draws a sample from this population on each trial of a learning experiment. All stimulus-response theories have stimuli that are "connected" or "conditioned" to possible responses of the entity. A natural extension of SST theory provides explanations of discrimination, generalization, temporal processes, and even motivational phenomena.

The "folding-in" technique used in classrooms today is derived from the stimulus sampling theory. An example of the folding-in procedure is a student reviewing ten flash cards (seven known, three unknown) and working through them till the student learns the ten cards 100%. After learning the ten cards, the student then replaces the three originally unknown cards with three more unknown cards. This drill is used to promote acquisition and fluency, and studies have shown that drill is extremely effective in teaching a wide range of responses.

== Career highlights ==
1941
Estes and his mentor B.F. Skinner presented their analysis of anxiety, introducing the conditioned emotional response (CER)/conditioned fear response (CFR) paradigm, such that rats were trained to respond on an operant schedule that produced a steady response rate, after which they were tested with an electric shock stimulus that was conditioned as a fear signal. The fear signal suppressed the operant response, and the magnitude of suppression was used as a measure of anxiety. The CER/CFR became used widely to study Pavlovian conditioning in a variety of organisms.

1950
Estes presented his influential stimulus sampling theory in the Psychological Review article Toward a Statistical theory of Learning. This theory assumes that conditioning involves associating responses to the elements of a stimulus that are sampled on a particular trial. Variability in learning arises because of the statistical properties of sampling elements randomly from a larger population of potential elements.
Later Works

1970
Learning Theory and Mental Development
1991
Statistical Models in Behavioral Research
1994
Classification and Cognition

== Notable affiliations ==
- Member of Society of Experimental Psychologists
- Nominated Adviser National Academy of Sciences
- A founding editor for Journal of Mathematical Psychology through the Society of Mathematical Psychology
- A founding editor for Journal of Psychological Science through the Association for Psychological Science

=== Awards and honors ===
- 1962 Distinguished Research and Contribution Award from the American Psychological Association
- 1963 Warren Medal from the Society of Experimental Psychologists, Nominated to the National Academy of Sciences
- 1992 American Psychological Foundation Gold Medal for Lifetime Achievement in Psychological Science
- 1997 National Medal of Science for his "'fundamental theories of learning, memory, and decision'" by President Bill Clinton

== Selected bibliography ==
- Estes, W. K. (1960), "A random-walk model for choice behaviour", in Arrow, Kenneth J.; Karlin, Samuel; Suppes, Patrick (eds.), Mathematical models in the social sciences, 1959: Proceedings of the first Stanford symposium, Stanford mathematical studies in the social sciences, IV, Stanford, California: Stanford University Press, pp. 265–276, ISBN 978-0-8047-0021-4.

== See also ==
Mathematical psychology
