= Bruno Klopfer Award =

Award for lifetime achievement in personality psychology

The Bruno Klopfer Award is an award for lifetime achievement in personality psychology managed by the Society for Personality Assessment. It is the Society's most prestigious award and is named after the Society's founder Bruno Klopfer.

It was first awarded in 1965 as the "Great Man Award", but was renamed in 1970 after it was bestowed on a woman.

== Recipients ==
Source: The Society for Personality Assessment

Year	Recipient
2023	Gregory J. Meyer
2022	Yossef S. Ben-Porath
2021	Aaron Lee Pincus
2020	R. Michael Bagby
2019	Judith Armstrong
2018	Thomas Widiger
2017	Leslie Morey
2016	Robert D. Hare
2015	John Graham
2014	Phebe Cramer
2013	Robert R. McCrae
2012	David L. Shapiro
2011	Stephen E. Finn
2010	Roger L. Greene
2009	Lewis R. Goldberg
2008	Leonard Handler
2007	Lorna Smith Benjamin
2006	Constance T. Fischer
2005	George Stricker
2004	James N. Butcher
2003	Alex Caldwell
2002	Jerry S. Wiggins
2001	Theodore Millon
2000	Auke Tellegen
1999	Jack Block
1998	David C. McClelland
1997	Joseph M. Masling
1996	Paul M. Lerner
1995	S. Philip Erdberg
1994	W. Grant Dahlstrom
1993	Jane Loevinger
1992	Lee J. Cronbach
1991	Leopold Bellak
1990	Charles Donald Spielberger
1989	Sidney J. Blatt
1988	Wayne H. Holtzman
1987	Harrison G. Gough
1986	Walter G. Klopfer
1985	Stephen A. Appelbaum
1984	Richard H. Dana
1983	Irving B. Weiner
1982	Gordon F. Derner
1981	Martin Mayman
1980	John E. Exner, Jr.
1979	Paul E. Meehl
1978	Roy Schafer
1977	Albert I. Rabin
1976	Edwin S. Shneidman
1975	Silvan S. Tomkins
1974	Louise Bates Ames
1973	William E. Henry
1972	Molly Harrower
1971	Zygmunt A. Piotrowski
1970	Marguerite R. Hertz
1969	Robert R. Holt
1967	Henry A. Murray
1966	Bruno Klopfer
1965	Samuel Jacob Beck

== See also ==
- List of psychology awards
- List of prizes named after people
