= Richard M. Elliott =

American psychologist

- Born: Richard Maurice Elliott; 3 November 1887; Lowell, Massachusetts, United States
- Died: 6 May 1969 (aged 81); Minneapolis, Minnesota
- Education: Harvard University
- Scientific career
- Fields: Psychology
- Workplaces: University of Minnesota
- Doctoral advisor: Hugo Münsterberg
- Doctoral students: Starke R. Hathaway

Richard Maurice "Mike" Elliott (November 3, 1887 – May 6, 1969) was an American psychologist who served as the departmental chair of the University of Minnesota Psychology Department from 1919 until 1951.

== Biography ==
Elliott was born in Lowell, Massachusetts. He received his Bachelor's degree from Dartmouth College and in 1910 went on to graduate school at Harvard University where he was advised by Hugo Münsterberg and influenced by Robert Yerkes. During World War I, Elliott conducted mental testing under the command of Donald G. Paterson. Elliott arrived to chair the new University of Minnesota Psychology Department in 1919.

Elliott was credited with building the Minnesota psychology department into a world-class institution, recruiting eminent psychologists including Karl Lashley, B. F. Skinner, Starke R. Hathaway, Paul Meehl, and Donald G. Paterson during his 32-year term as chair of the department.

Elliot Hall, the Psychology building at the University of Minnesota, is named after Elliot.
