= Starke R. Hathaway =

American psychologist

Starke Rosecrans Hathaway
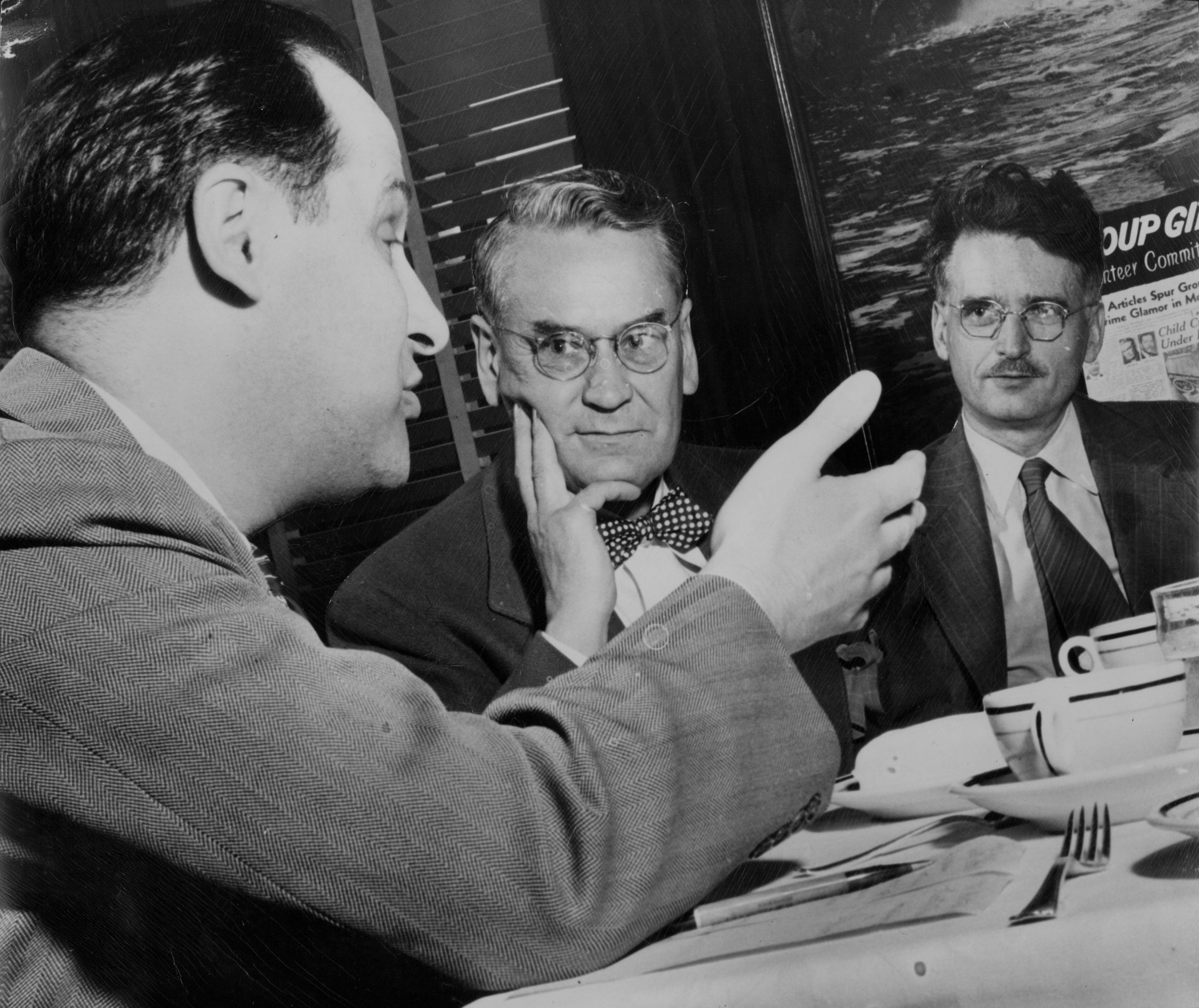
- Hathaway (right)
- Born: August 22, 1903; Central Lake, Michigan, United States
- Died: July 4, 1984 (aged 80); Minneapolis, Minnesota
- Education: University of Minnesota
- Known for: Minnesota Multiphasic Personality Inventory
- Awards: APA Distinguished Scientific Award for the Applications of Psychology
- Scientific career
- Fields: Psychology
- Workplaces: University of Minnesota
- Doctoral advisor: Richard M. Elliott
- Doctoral students: Paul E. Meehl, Harrison G. Gough, w. Grant Dahlstrom

Starke R. Hathaway (August 22, 1903 – July 4, 1984) was an American psychologist who co-authored the psychological assessment known as the Minnesota Multiphasic Personality Inventory (MMPI). He was a longtime faculty member of the Department of Psychology at the University of Minnesota.

== Early life ==
Hathaway was born in Central Lake, Michigan, on August 22, 1903, moved to Kansas at the age of 7, and grew up in Marysville, Ohio. As a child, Starke showed great interest in mechanical, electrical, chemical, and quantitative processes. By the time he was 8 years old, Hathaway was allowed to build his own workshop outside the family home.

== Education ==
Following his electrical interests and drive, Hathaway entered the school of engineering at Ohio University in the early 1920s. However, he was disappointed in the lack of opportunities and outlets that his talent required, and he felt that he was not being challenged. As such, Hathaway began to seek out more challenging material. He was immediately attracted to psychology and switched majors, although his approach did not waver and focused on mechanistic and quantitative methods. By 1927, he had graduated from Ohio University with his bachelor's degree in psychology, with a minor in mathematics, and stayed to continue his education. He studied under James P. Porter as a graduate student, whom he considered to be an important influence in his development as a psychologist. A year later, in 1928, he obtained his master's degree in psychology.

After graduation, Hathaway served as a research assistant in engineering with Harry Johnson at Carnegie Mellon University in Pittsburgh. Here, he developed an automatic camera that enabled researchers to record participants' movements while they slept. This invention is one of the contributions acknowledged by the American Psychological Associations in awarding him the APA Distinguished Scientific Award for the Applications of Psychology in 1977.

In 1932, Hathaway took a position as a lecturer while also pursuing his PhD in psychology from the University of Minnesota under the mentorship of Richard M. Elliott. During his time there, he was influenced by the work of Karl Lashley, B. F. Skinner, Edna Heidbreder, and Donald G. Paterson. He received his PhD in psychology, with a concentration in physiology, and his dissertation was titled, "An Action Potential Study of Neuromuscular Relations during the Simple Reaction".

== Academic career ==
Hathaway stayed as an associate professor in psychology at the UMN Hospital, with a joint appointment in the department of anatomy. His chief responsibility during this appointment was to establish a division of clinical psychology in the department of psychiatry at the UMN Medical School. The concurrent training of psychologists and psychiatrists was with little conflict as Hathaway's approach incorporated rigorous quantification to mental health based on empirical principles. He believed that psychological qualities could be engineered and influenced in the same was physical matter could be. Further, Hathaway adamantly argued that biological processes underlie psychological phenomena and that anatomical and physiological education is essential to their understanding. His childhood interests continued into the development of his notable career, as much of what he had initially accomplished during these early years was engineering and mechanically focused. Hathaway was credited with designing an ideal psychiatric facility and building amplification equipment to measure neuromuscular potentials for research conducted at the hospital, the psychogalvanometer.

I tried always to teach that agnosticism towards systems is a sophisticated orientation and it can afford a secure structure in which one can use pragmatically the methods and theories available.

Hathaway was avidly interested in other languages and international collaboration. He had a working knowledge of French and German, and facile in Spanish. He often lectured or led discussions in Spanish at the National Autonomous University during his annual trips to Mexico. Although he did not view himself as a promoter of the MMPI and did not accept invitations to conduct workshops or hold lectures, he was much more interested in extending the use of the instrument to other cultures and making it available in other languages. He collaborated with and provided consultation on the translation of the MMPI into Spanish, published in Mexico in 1967, and used in Cuba, Puerto Rico, and Mexico.

In 1937, Hathaway was awarded tenure as a member of the faculty of the medical school, working closely with the medical staff. Through this appointment, Hathaway began working closely with J. C. McKinley, with whom he later created the MMPI. He collaborated often with E. D. Monachesi and Whit Longstaff. Further, throughout his time at UMN, Hathaway trained several influential graduate students, including Paul E. Meehl, Harrison G. Gough, W. Grant Dahlstrom, and Howard Hunt.

In 1963, he was granted the APA Distinguished Scientific Contribution Award in 1959 and served as the APA President in 1963. In 1977, Hathaway received the APA Distinguished Scientific Award for the Applications of Psychology.

== Professional contributions ==
=== Minnesota Multiphasic Personality Inventory ===
In the 1930s, the time when Hathaway and McKinley first began constructing their novel personality inventory, psychiatry and neurology had become established clinical specialties in the United States, yet there was little unity between both clinical fields and with psychology. Following WWI, numerous personality assessments were published, including the MMPI. However, many of these assessments that claimed to detect clinical problems or serve as aids in psychiatric diagnoses had not been validated against external criteria. Conversely, the MMPI remedied those deficits and provided the practitioner with a means of clinical diagnosis that could be used by the general medical professional within a variety of settings, as well as nonmedical professionals. The MMPI was developed specifically with an empirical criterion approach to operationalize clinical phenomena derived by selecting items known to be endorsed by patients with certain pathologies. The difference between this approach and other test development strategies used around that time was that it was in many ways atheoretical (not based on any particular theory) and thus the initial test was not aligned with the prevailing psychodynamic theories. This measure was successful in capturing aspects of human psychopathology that were recognizable and meaningful despite changes in clinical theories.

Acceptance of the test grew steadily (Dahlstrom, 1992) until by the late 1950s, the MMPI had become the most widely used objective measure of personality and psychopathology, and the subject of both basic and applied research. In addition to extensive use in clinics and hospitals, the test was being administered to patients in general medical settings, to inmates in correctional facilities, to military personnel, and to candidates for positions involving high stress and responsibility for public safety. Furthermore, the test was being translated into foreign languages—by 1976 over 50 translations were available.

However, the MMPI had flaws of validity that were soon apparent and could not be overlooked indefinitely. The control group for its original testing consisted of a very small number of individuals, mostly young, white, and married people from rural Midwestern geographic areas. The MMPI also faced problems with a number of the items were deemed outdated or offensive because of sexual or religious content, its terminology not being relevant to the population it was supposed to measure, and it became necessary for the MMPI to measure a more diverse number of potential mental health problems, such as "suicidal tendencies, drug abuse, and treatment-related behaviors."

With graduate student Paul Meehl, Hathaway developed three validity scales embedded within the MMPI: the L, or lie, scale indicates when a client is "faking good"; the F, or infrequency, scale indicates when a client is "faking bad"; the K, defensiveness scale identifies individuals in denial about their behaviors and symptoms. The initial scales included: hypochondriasis (Hp), depression (D), hysteria (Hy), psychopathic deviate (Pd), paranoia (Pa), psychasthenia (Ps), schizophrenia (Sc), mania (Ma). Shortly after the MMPI was published, research began to be conducted on its use with adolescents, and in the mid-50s Hathaway and Monachesi, intending to expand use of the test by employing it to predict delinquency among adolescents, conducted a series of longitudinal studies and reported their findings in a book, organizing coded profiles for juveniles based on adult atlas of profiles

=== Instrumentation ===
Consistent with his life-long interests and background, Hathaway's early work focused on developing mechanical and electrical devices to measure psychological processes. His first publication as a graduate student in 1929, "A Comparative Study of Psychogalvanic and Association Time Measures: A New Psychogalvanic Apparatus", demonstrated his ability to conceptualize psychological and mental processes and to use biological and engineering methods to quantify them. This apparatus was used to measure galvanic skin response in a reliable manner, both at rest and during emotionally salient conditions. He patented this device as a "lie detector" and built and sold 30 devices to other psychology departments. He was henceforth noted nationwide as the inventor of a lie-detector machine and it was used to solve a murder case in Athens, Ohio.

=== Physiological psychology ===
Physiological psychology is not a separate science but is, as the name implies, a link between two basically similar sciences, physiology and psychology. Its content and definitions are determined by its raison d'etre; namely, by the need felt by psychologists working in the fields of general, clinical, and animal psychology for an enriched vocabulary and for a simplified by fundamentally workable grounding in the allied biological sciences.

In the early 1940s, Starke Hathaway authored two textbooks, An Outline of Neuropsychiatry (1940), which served as an indexed resource for diagnosis of nervous and mental diseases, and Physiological Psychology (1942), which summarized the central nervous system and functional subsystems and psychological and behavioral consequences of injury and disease.

== As a clinician ==
Later in his career, Hathaway moved beyond his original interest in psychophysiology and diagnosis and became interested in psychotherapy. He avoided theories and orientations that dictated universal treatment strategies and instead favored models that were designed to fit particular cases and clients. Took an empirical approach to cognitive/medical psychology regarding therapy, rather than imposing his own biases or preconceptions on data, let the data speak for themselves. He referred to his methods as pragmatical or "redirective psychotherapy" and described them as resembling Albert Elis rational emotive behavior therapy. He was a master clinician, with great sensitivity to the problems of others and skill at helping others see their problems clearly. His pragmatic orientation well-suited him to helping patients with psychological disorders, particularly those with chronic, long-term problems who were often referred to him by other clinicians. He was also well known for founding an experimental inpatient treatment unit at the UMN Hospital in the 1960s.

== Personal qualities ==
Hathaway was often described as pragmatic, a trait that was central to the approach he took to every area he pursued, breaking down larger problems into its component parts. He described himself as a "nuts and bolts" empiricist in everything he undertook. He applied rigorous quantification and empiricism to human and psychological problems. He strongly believed human problems could be "engineered" in much the same way as physical matter could be influenced by electrical and mechanical forces. This was an idea he shared with B. F. Skinner with whom he often engaged in intense discussions and debates.

Along with his mechanical proclivities, Hathaway was an avid fisherman and he spent a great deal of time at his cabin in northern Minnesota, fishing for walleyes. However, he was never far from a workshop to continue working on mechanical and electrical projects, up until the year of his death. He died in Minneapolis in 1984 after an extended illness.

Roland Peek (the former chief of Psychological Services for the Department of Public Welfare of Minnesota) contributed to the collection of letters presented to Hathaway at a ceremony honoring his contributions in psychology in 1969. In it, he wrote:

Starke Hathaway? One of those unforgettable characters, as everyone knows, of course. But why? Well for me there is a kaleidoscopic glitter of images and memories, all unforgettable: his eyes, kindly and penetrating; the unsettling frequency of his mind-reading in clinical settings; his absent-minded combing of a brain model as he paced and lectured in physiological psychology, with a scrap of comb rescued from the floor; unmatched shoes cocked uncomfortably on a VA desk-top; his quiet encouragement of an uncertain student, and his skillful reshaping of a brash one; white duck trousers made greasy from crawling under a car just before the lecture; incisive cuts through words to the essence of things. If psychology has some kind of soul, Starke Hathaway is surely part of it.

== Lasting contributions to psychology ==
With the collaboration of J. C. McKinley, Hathaway brought a desperately needed personality assessment that provided and objective portrayal of clinical symptoms and problems. Through their method of "blind empiricism", the MMPI has upheld the test of time and application. One of the more distinguishing features of Hathaway and McKinley's questionnaire was the use of a large "normal" population to serve as a reference group against which clinical samples could be compared to develop scales that would empirically differentiate clinical groups. Hathaway was an avid believer in test norms and standard units of measurement for assessing clinical dimensions. He insisted that one should not develop norms to be used for a specific population and believed that the MMPI norms should be the same for the varying groups that take it, from the elderly, adolescent, or international and cross-cultural population. Although Hathaway was not the first psychologist to address the impact of response bias on the quality of data obtained, his work with Paul Meehl on the development of the L, F, and K scales represented a major contribution to the science of personality assessment.

On the occasion honoring Hathaway's contribution in 1969, Harry Harlow wrote:

I have always been pleased by the fact that it took an experimental-physiological psychologist to create the most meritorious personality test ever achieved. Frankly, I have often mediated on the intervening variables that must have operated during this intellectual transition, but whatever they may have been, the fact is that you remain psychologists' greatest contribution to the psychiatric process.

Not only did Hathaway provide this rigorous empiricism to his development of psychological and physiological instruments, but also to the conceptualization of clinical cases. Rather than imposing his own biases or preconceptions on the data, Hathaway chose to let the data speak for themselves. Specifically, he let patterns, or profile types, of the MMPI that differed from the general population serve as identifiers of traits and clinical symptoms as well as predictors of behavior. Stemming from this empirical orientation, Hathaway and colleagues cataloged cases in reference guides known as "atlases" to guide practitioners in determining the meaning of particular scale elevations or profile patterns.

Hathaway's empirical orientation and his desire to apply rigorous objective methods to the science of psychology (from personality to physiology) and clinical, applied work advanced the field substantially. Although Hathaway was credited with many contributions and a lasting mark on the field, he discouraged accepting anything as "standard" (even the MMPI). Regarding the movement to revise the MMPI, he noted about what he saw as a "mystery of missing progress".

With so many competent efforts over so many years, why have we not yet developed better personality tests? I could extend the question to a more arbitrary one: Why are we today unable to confidently undertake the development of significantly more valid and useful tests?

Hathaway had expressed disappointment with what he saw as a lack of progress in the field, and openly challenged researchers and academics to strive for innovation and to improve personality assessment through empirical iterative processes. Hathaway ended his professional career with the same down-to-earth, questioning, pragmatic approach he used when he began it.

== See also ==
- Psychological testing
