= Don Patterson =

Don Patterson may refer to:

- Don Patterson (American football coach) (born 1950), college football coach
- Don Patterson (defensive back) (born 1957), former American football player
- Don Patterson (animator) (1909–1998), American animator and director
- Don Patterson (organist) (1936–1988), American jazz organist
- Donald D. Patterson (1911–1972), businessman and political figure in New Brunswick, Canada
- Donald Patterson (Pennsylvania politician) (1935/1936–2016), Inspector General of Pennsylvania
- Donald J. Patterson (born 1972), American professor of computer science

== See also ==
- Donald Paterson (disambiguation)
