= Samuel Beck =

Samuel Beck may refer to:

- Samuel Jacob Beck (1896–1980), American psychologist
- Samuel J. Beck (1835–1906), metallurgist, land developer and politician in Montana and Los Angeles
