= Leslie Morey =

American psychologist

Leslie Charles Morey
- Born: May 4, 1956; Chicago Heights, Illinois
- Scientific career
- Fields: Psychology and psychiatry

Leslie Charles Morey is an American psychologist and an expert in diagnosis and psychiatric classification.

== Life and career ==
He was born in Chicago Heights, Illinois on May 4, 1956. Morey received a Bachelor of Science degree in psychology from Northern Illinois University in 1977, and a Master of Science and Doctorate from University of Florida in clinical psychology in the years 1979 and 1981. Morey continued on to serve a clinical internship in 1981 at the University of Texas Health Science Center at San Antonio. From 1981 to 1982 he worked at the Department of Psychology at the University of Tulsa. Beginning in 1982, and ending in 1984, he worked as the assistant professor of Psychology and Psychiatry at the Yale School of Medicine, and then in 1984, he transferred to Vanderbilt University where he worked as the Professor of Psychology and the Director of Clinical Training until 1998. He worked at the Vanderbilt University until 1999. Morey worked at Harvard Medical School from 1995 to 1996, and from 2006 to 2010 he was the head of the department of psychology at the Texas A&M University. Since 2012 he has worked as their George T. and Gladys H. Abell professor of Psychology.

== Research interests ==
His research primarily concentrated on the fields of psychiatry and psychology. Specifically, personality, personality disorders, psychopathology, and alcoholism. Morey has written over 280 articles and books on mental disorders, which have been cited more than 30,000 times. He is in top 1% of cited researchers in the field of psychiatry. He has also developed the Personality Assessment Inventory, which is one of the most commonly used screening methods in the field of psychiatry. The American Psychiatric Association appointed him to the work group on Personality and Personality disorders for the DSM-5 due to his academic success, where he worked on the Alternative DSM-5 Model for Personality Disorders.

== Awards and recognition ==
For his work, he has been awarded the 2016 Presidential Award, the 2013 Walter Klopfer Award, and the 2017 Bruno Klopfer Award. The APA also awarded the Distinguished Scientific Contributions award for his contributions to Clinical Psychology. Morey was also awarded the title "Outstanding Alumnus of the Year" in 2020 for "exemplary leadership in psychology research and education by the College of Public Health and Health Professions." He was also the associate editor of the Journal of Personality Assessment from 2005 to 2007, and the journal Assessment from 1992 to 2004. He was also on the editorial board of the Journal of Psychopathology and Behavior Assessment, Psychological Bulletin, Contemporary Psychology. Currently, Morey serves on the editorial board of the journals Assessment, Journal of Personality Disorders, Personality Disorders: Theory, Research and Treatment, Psychological Assessment, Journal of Personality Assessment, Borderline Personality Disorder and Emotion Dysregulation.
