= Patrice Beddor =

Phonetician

- Occupation: Linguist

Academic background
- Education: University of Minnesota

Academic work
- Institutions: University of Michigan
- Main interests: Phonetics, Sound change, Phonology

Patrice (Pam) Speeter Beddor is John C. Catford Collegiate Professor (Emerita) of Linguistics at the University of Michigan. Her research focuses on phonology and phonetics. Her research has dealt with phonetics, including work in coarticulation, speech perception, and the relationship between perception and production.

== Education ==
Beddor received a B.S. from the University of Minnesota in French. She spent a year of her Ph.D. program studying in Paris at the Universite de Paris VII, Sorbonne from 1976-1977, and returned to the University of Minnesota to finish her Ph.D. in Linguistics in 1982 with primary advisor Winifred Strange. Her dissertation, entitled Phonological and phonetic effects of nasalization on vowel height, was published by the Indiana University Linguistics Club in 1983.

== Career and research ==
Beddor held a post-doc at Haskins Labs and was a lecturer at Yale before becoming a linguistics faculty member at the University of Michigan in 1987. In 2011 she was named a John C. Catford Collegiate Professor of Linguistics. She served as the Chair for the Department of Linguistics at the University of Michigan from 2004 to 2010, and later served as interim chair from 2013-2014.

Beddor is focused mostly in the Fields of Phonetics, Perception- Production relations, and Sound change, and much of her research focuses on production, acoustics, and perception of coarticulation. She has also done work in laboratory phonology, especially the phonetic underpinnings of sound change, with an interest in the relation between the cognitive representation and the physical instantiation of speech. She has numerous publications on these topics, in books and prestigious journals.

=== Teaching ===
In addition to research she is a professor and mentor. She has spent a part of her career working with undergraduate and graduate students, and has received the University of Michigan LSA Excellence in Education award and the Rackham School of Graduate Studies John D’Arms award (2002).

== Honors ==
Beddor is an elected member of the International Phonetic Association Council, and is a member of the Weinberg institute for Cognitive Science Executive Committee.

In 2018, Beddor was inducted as a Fellow of the Linguistic Society of America.

== Selected publications ==
- Krakow, R. A., Beddor, P. S., Goldstein, L. M., & Fowler, C. A. (1988). Coarticulatory influences on the perceived height of nasal vowels. The Journal of the Acoustical Society of America, 83(3), 1146-1158.
- Patrice Speeter Beddor. 1993. The perception of nasal vowels. In Nasals, Nasalization, and the Velum. Phonetics and Phonology, vol. 5. 171–196. https://doi.org/10.1016/B978-0-12-360380-7.50011-9
- P.S. Beddor. JD Harnsberger, S Lindemann. 2002. Language-specific patterns of vowel-to-vowel coarticulation: Acoustic structures and their perceptual correlates. Journal of phonetics 30: 591–627. https://doi.org/10.1006/jpho.2002.0177
- Maria-Josep Sole, Patrice Speeter Beddor & Manjari Ohala (Editors). 2007. Experimental approaches to phonology. Oxford University Press. ISBN 978-0199296828
- Beddor, P. S. (2009). A Coarticulatory Path to Sound Change. Language, 85(4), 785–821. JSTOR 40492954
- Beddor, P. S. 2012. Perception grammars and sound change. The Initiation of Sound Change: Production, Perception, and Social Factors, eds. M-J. Solé and D. Recasens, pp. 37–55. John Benjamins.
- Beddor, P. S. 2013. Speech perception. Oxford Bibliographies Online: Linguistics, ed. M. Aronoff. http://www.oxfordbibliographies.com/obo/page/linguistics
