= Mayman =

Mayman is a surname. Notable people with the surname include:

- William "Bill" Mayman (1887–1970), Australian rules footballer
- Jan Mayman (died 2021), Australian journalist
- Martin Mayman (1924–1999), American psychologist
- Pauline Mayman (1928–1989), British rally car driver
- Scott Mayman, Australian radio presenter
