= Donald Peterson =

Donald Peterson may refer to:

- Donald H. Peterson (1933–2018), United States Air Force officer and astronaut
- Donald R. Peterson (1923–2007), professor of psychology at Rutgers University
- C. Donald Peterson (1918–1987), American jurist and politician
- Don Peterson, American business executive
- Don Peterson (American football) (1928–2010), American football player

== See also ==
- Donald Paterson (disambiguation)
