= George Schlager Welsh =

- Born: George Schlager Welsh; 24 September 1918; Kingston, Pennsylvania, US
- Died: 10 December 1990 (aged 72); Chapel Hill, North Carolina, US
- Education: University of Minnesota
- Scientific career
- Fields: Psychology
- Workplaces: University of North Carolina, Chapel Hill
- Doctoral advisor: Paul E. Meehl

George Schlager Welsh (September 24, 1918 – December 10, 1990), an early personality researcher, was best known for his research on creativity. Having a diverse range of experiences in psychopathology and personality assessment during World War II times, he dedicated his career to developing and utilizing personality assessment tools.

== Biography ==
Welsh was born on September 24, 1918, in Kingston, Pennsylvania. His father was an architect and his mother was a homemaker; together they had four children, George and three daughters.

Welsh met and married Alice Mendenhall, a speech pathologist, at the University of Minnesota in 1949. They do not appear to have had any children. About 10 years later, the two moved to Chapel Hill, NC, where they spent the remainder of their lives. G. S. Welsh died on December 10, 1990, at the age of 72, at his home, the historic Woolen-Roberts-Welsh House, in Chapel Hill, NC. Following his death, The University of North Carolina at Chapel Hill developed the Welsh Professorship, in honor of his and his wife's commitment to the university and the community of Chapel Hill.

His wife, Alice Welsh, died December 23, 2013, at the age of 93, in Chapel Hill, North Carolina.

== Education and early career ==
Welsh developed an early interest in language and psychology, earning his bachelor's degree in psychology and English from the University of Pennsylvania in 1940. He then continue his education at the University of Pennsylvania, earning his master's degree in clinical and experimental psychology in 1943.

During World War II, Welsh served in many capacities, both military and academic. He served as an assistant instructor at the University of Pennsylvania. He also served as a psychometrist at the Army Induction Center in Philadelphia and as psychologist in many other locations. Circa 1945, he became the chief of Psychology Service at Bushnell General Hospital in Utah, where he was tasked with assessing the mental status of Italian POWs, despite his lack knowledge of the language. This spawned his desire to develop non-verbal measures of psychopathology that could be used across language barriers, an interest that remained with him throughout the remainder of his education.

In 1947, Welsh entered the University of Minnesota's clinical psychology doctoral program. While still working on his degree in 1948, he was appointed Acting Chief Psychologist at Fort Snelling Veterans Administration Hospital in Minneapolis. While working at the VA Hospital, 1948 to 1949, he attempted to develop a non-verbal version of the Minnesota Multiphasic Personality Inventory (MMPI). He created 400+ black and white designs to use for this measure. People were then to select which pictures they liked and disliked. Welsh sought to match image preference tendencies with specific emotional disorders. This work became his doctoral dissertation. In 1949, Welsh earned his PhD in clinical psychology from the University of Minnesota. His doctoral dissertation, entitled “A projective figure-preference test for diagnosis of psychopathology: I. A preliminary investigation,” focused on developing this non-verbal test for psychopathology. Although this measure was not a successful measure of psychopathology, it spawned a career long interest in psychological assessment.

== Professional career ==
Following the receipt of his PhD in clinical psychology from the University of Minnesota in 1949, Welsh worked for the Veterans’ Administration in the Bay Area and served as assessment researcher at the Institute for Personality Assessment and Research at UC Berkeley. When at UC Berkeley, he developed close relationships with Harrison G. Gough and Frank Barron. He began collaborating with Gough and Barron on researching personality assessment and the nature of creativity. These interests and collaborations continued throughout Welsh's life. Welsh realized the non-verbal MMPI he created while working on his PhD may be tapping into something besides psychopathology and emotional disorders. He began exploring the idea that it may be tapping into creativity, something that is often very closely linked with psychopathology.

In 1959, Welsh developed the Welsh Figure Preference Test, as a modified version of the non-verbal MMPI. The purpose of this test was to measure or predict creativity. Similar to the non-verbal MMPI, this test consisted of 400 black and white figures, which participants were to indicate which ones they liked and disliked. Welsh classified these various figures as “creative,” meaning they were complex and asymmetric, and “not creative,” meaning they were simple and symmetric. Liking more creative pictures was thought to be indicative of a more creative personality. The next step was the creation of the Barron-Welsh art scale.

In 1963, Welsh collaborated with Frank Barron in the creation of the Barron-Welsh Art Scale. This consists of 86 line drawings; respondents indicate whether they "like" or "dislike" each one. As on the older measure, preference for more complex, asymmetric images is considered to reflect a more creative personality. The test, which remains available through Mindgarden, has been utilized in over 90 peer-reviewed journal articles listed by PsycINFO as of early 2019.

In 1953, Welsh joined the faculty at the University of North Carolina at Chapel Hill. While at UNC, Chapel Hill, Welsh co-authored many publications and had many enriching experiences. In 1956, Welsh co-authored Basic Readings on the MMPI in Psychology and Medicine. Then, from 1956 to 1957, Welsh was a visiting Fulbright Professor at the Instituto di Psicologia in Florence, Italy. Then in 1960, and later in 1972, he co-authored and co-edited An MMPI Handbook, editions 1 & 2, comprehensive texts on the MMPI. In 1962, Welsh coauthored, alongside E. Earl Baughman, Personality: a Behavioral Science, one of the first textbooks on personality.

Next, in 1963, Welsh began serving as research coordinator for the North Carolina Governor's School for the academically and artistically talented. Here he used summer program attendees as study subjects. Utilizing the Barron-Welsh Art Scale, he assessed the creative expectations for the school's students. This was a critical experience for his career, in that he was able to establish his measure as a reliable predictor of creativity among children.

In 1975, Welsh published a seminal piece in creativity literature, a comprehensive volume of his work on creativity and intelligence entitled Creativity and Intelligence: A Personality Approach. In this text, he introduced two new dimensions of creative personality: intellectence, the capacity to utilize abstract intelligence, and origence, the capacity to produce novel ideas. In 1992, W. Grant Dahlstrom stated, “This work is a lasting contribution to the challenging task of predicting creative talent.” Multiple editions have since been updated and published.

Throughout the remainder of his career, he taught many psychology courses at the University of North Carolina, Chapel Hill, including personality courses and assessment courses, directed doctoral dissertation research for 32 graduate students, and continued studying and publishing on creativity and personality assessment.

== Impact on personality research ==
As of April 15, 2015, Welsh's publications on personality and measurement have been cited hundreds of times over the past few decades.
