= Molly Harrower =

American clinical psychologist

- Born: Mary Rachel Harrower; 25 January 1906; Johannesburg, South Africa
- Died: 20 February 1999 (aged 93); Gainesville, Florida, U.S.
- Occupation: Psychologist
- Known for: Multiple choice Rorschach test
- Awards: Bruno Klopfer Award (1972)

Molly Harrower (born Mary Rachel Harrower; January 25, 1906 – February 20, 1999) was an American clinical psychologist. During the Second World War she created a large-scale multiple choice Rorschach test. She was one of the first clinical psychologists to open a private practice. Specializing in diagnostics, Harrower developed a scale allowing practitioners to predict which patients would profit from psychotherapy.

== Family and early life ==
Molly Harrower was born in Johannesburg, South Africa, the daughter of James, a banker, and Ina (née White) Harrower. Her Scottish-born parents were visiting South Africa when she was born and the family returned to the United Kingdom while she was an infant. Their home was in Cheam, a village south of London. Molly Harrower had one brother, who was three years younger. From the age of ten she attended the Godolphin School in Salisbury where she excelled at sports, particularly cricket.

== Education ==
After leaving the Godolphin School Harrower was sent to a finishing school in Paris. She was unhappy with the school environment so her parents sent her to live with a family while learning French in Switzerland for a year.

In 1925, with the help of a family friend, she was admitted to Bedford College's journalism program despite having no academic qualifications. After auditing a psychology course taught by Beatrice Edgell, who became a mentor to her, Harrower switched to a program leading to an academic diploma in psychology. She did not complete the three-year program, being forced to leave after two years because of her family's financial difficulties. She then spent four months in France on a scholarship to study painting and dancing before returning to England, where she worked as an assistant to C.K. Ogden, mainly in his capacity as a book dealer in Cambridge.

Ogden recommended her to his friend the Gestalt psychologist Kurt Koffka, who directed the psychology laboratory at Smith College in Massachusetts. Smith College granted her a fellowship and she began working with Koffka in 1928. On the invitation of Beatrice Edgell she returned to Bedford College in 1932 as a temporary senior lecturer, filling in for one year after the accidental death of her former teacher Victoria Hazlitt. Under Koffka's supervision she earned a PhD in 1934 for a dissertation entitled Organization in Higher Mental Processes. Hers was the first psychology doctorate awarded by Smith College. The external examiners were George Humphrey, Edwin Boring, and Arnold Gesell.

== Career ==
=== Research ===
Harrower became interested in clinical psychology when she observed major changes in a friend's personality after surgery. The Rockefeller Foundation granted her a three-year post-doctoral fellowship, which she took up in 1937, to study "the psychological effects of surgical operations, the impact of surgical shock" at the Montreal Neurological Institute (MNI). In order to become familiar with the hospital setting she first spent six months working with Kurt Goldstein at the Montefiore Hospital in New York. At the MNI she worked with Wilder Penfield, and was involved as a psychologist in the pioneering neural stimulation studies that led to the development of the Montreal procedure for treating epilepsy.

Early in the Second World War, Harrower received a grant from the Canadian National Research Council to develop a large-scale Rorschach test. The group test was used to screen military recruits based on their responses when shown a standard series of inkblot designs. The subjects were given a list of possible interpretations from which to choose and a high number of "neurotic" choices was seen as necessitating a "psychiatric check-up". This allowed the Rorschach to be given to large groups in as little as 15 minutes, in comparison to the normally administered Rorschach that could take an hour per individual. The Multiple Choice Rorschach attracted a flurry of attention in the few years after, but test was ultimately found to be of little value.

In 1941 Harrower moved from Montreal to Madison, Wisconsin where her husband, neurosurgeon Theodore Erickson, had obtained a position at the University of Wisconsin–Madison medical school. She received funding from the Macy Foundation to continue developing and training psychologists in the use of large-scale Rorschach tests. She also worked as a consultant to the United States Army and Air Force as well as the United States Department of State. Harrower was a founding core member of the series of Macy conferences on cybernetics, attending the first five meetings until her resignation in 1949.

=== Clinical practice ===
Harrower opened a private practice in New York City in 1945, one of the first clinical psychologists to do so. She specialized in psychodiagnostic testing of medical patients referred to her by psychiatrists, neurologists and other physicians, using the Rorschach test as her primary tool. During the course of her practice she used her diagnostic techniques on over 1,600 patients, keeping records of each consultation, and followed up with the treating therapists to develop a scale predicting the likelihood of successful therapy. The result was published in 1965 in Psychodiagnostic Testing: An Empirical Approach.

After undergoing psychoanalysis herself from 1944 to 1946 she extended her practice to include psychotherapy. Among her innovative techniques was poetry therapy, about which she published a book, The Therapy of Poetry, in 1972. She also did consulting work for organizations such as the Children’s Court of Manhattan, the National Multiple Sclerosis Society, and the Unitarian-Universalist Church. She taught at the New School for Social Research from 1963 to 1968.

Harrower was president of the New York Society of Clinical Psychologists in 1952-53. She worked on the development of a certification program for New York State psychologists.

=== University of Florida ===
Harrower left New York and joined the faculty of the University of Florida in Gainesville in 1967, teaching clinical psychology. She retired at the age of 70 and was named an emeritus professor in 1975. In 1972 she was awarded the Bruno Klopfer Award by the Society for Personality Assessment. The University of Florida made her an honorary Doctor of Humane Letters in March 1981. She established the Molly Harrower Women's Golf Endowment at the University of Florida.

=== Publications ===
Harrower's publications include 20 books and more than 100 articles and book chapters. Among these were four books of poetry, the first of which, Plain Jane, was a book of children's poems published in 1929. In 1983 she published a selection of her correspondence with Kurt Koffka dating from 1930 until his death in 1941.

In 1976 Harrower published a notable article based on the examination of records of Rorschach tests administered to Nazi war criminals immediately after the Second World War. She found that they did not show any common personality type, and that some appeared to be psychologically normal. Based on this conclusion, she cautioned that "well-integrated, productive and secure personalities are no protection against being sucked into a vortex of myth and deception, which may ultimately erupt into the commitment of horror on a grand scale". This research led to her collaboration on a book published in 1995 entitled The Quest for the Nazi Personality: A Psychological Investigation of Nazi War Criminals.

== Personal life ==
Molly Harrower was married twice and had no children. Her first husband was Theodore Erickson, a neurosurgeon whom she met while working at the Montreal Neurological Institute. They were married in 1938 and were divorced in 1944. During their marriage she published under the name Harrower-Erickson. She married Mortimer Lahm, a businessman, in 1955. Lahm died in 1967.

After her retirement Harrower continued to live in Gainesville, Florida. She died at home on 20 February 1999.

== Partial bibliography ==
=== As sole author ===
- 1928, I Don't Mix Much With Fairies
- 1933, Spiral: and other poems
- 1946, Time to squander, time to reap New Bedford, MA: Reynolds Publishing.
- 1952, Appraising Personality
- 1958, Personality Change and Development
- 1962, The Practice of Clinical Psychology
- 1965, Psychodiagnostic T: An empirical approach, Springfield, IL: Charles C. Thomas.
- 1971, The Psychologist at Work (revised)
- 1972, The Therapy of Poetry Springfield, IL: Charles C. Thomas.
- 1978, "Changing horses in mid-stream: An experimentalist becomes a clinician." In T. S. Krawiec (Ed.), The psychologists: Autobiographies of distinguished living psychologists Vol. 3(pp. 85–104). Brandon, T: Clinical Psychology Publishing.
- 1983, Kurt Koffka: an unwitting self-portrait. Gainesville, FL: University of Florida Press.
- 1991, "Inkblots and poems." In C. E. Walker (Ed.) The history of clinical psychology in autobiography Vol. 1 (pp. 125–169). Pacific Grove, CA: Brooks/Cole.

=== Joint author ===
- 1951, Harrower, Molly, and Matilda Elizabeth Steiner., Large Scale Rorschach Techniques; A Manual for the Group Rorschach and Multiple Choice Tests. Springfield, Ill: Thomas.
- 1987, Harrower, M., Bowers D., The Inside Story: Self-Evaluations Reflecting Basic Rorschach Types
- 1995, Eric A. Zillmer, Molly Harrower, Barry A. Ritzler, Robert P. Arche, The Quest for the Nazi Personality: A Psychological Investigation of Nazi War Criminals.
