= Krugman (surname) =

Krugman is an Americanized form of the German surname Krugmann, an occupational surname based on occupation of a jug/mug seller/manufacturer or of an innkeeper. Notable people with the surname Krugman or Krugmann include:

- Irene Krugman Rudnick (1929–2019), American politician
- Martin Krugman (1919–1979), associate of the Lucchese crime family
- Morris Krugman (1899–1993), American psychologist
- Paul Krugman (born 1953), economist, New York Times columnist, and winner of the 2008 Nobel Memorial Prize in Economics
- Robin Wells Krugman (born 1959), American economist
- Roswitha Krugmann, marriage name of Roswitha Eberl (born 1958), East German sprint canoer
- Saul Krugman (1911–1995), inventor of the Hepatitis B vaccine.
