= Marguerite R. Hertz =

American psychologist

Marguerite Rosenberg Hertz (1899–1992) was an American psychologist who specialized in the Rorschach test.

She graduated from Hunter College in 1918 and obtained her PhD from Western Reserve University in 1932 and then later was a member of the faculty there from 1938 until her retirement in 1970. She was a founding member of the Society for Personality Assessment and served as its president the year of 1940 to 1941. She received the Bruno Klopfer Award in 1970.

She was an active member of the feminist movement. She served for a time as president of the Federation of Jewish Women's Organization and also served as president of the Cleveland Council of Jewish Women. She also was a member of the Social and Legislation Committees for the League of Women Voters, the National Council of Jewish Women and others.
