= Phebe Cramer =

American psychologist (1935–2021)

- Born: December 30, 1935; San Francisco, California, U.S.
- Died: April 2, 2021 (aged 85); Pittsfield, Massachusetts, U.S.
- Education: University of California, Berkeley; New York University
- Occupations: Clinical Psychologist and Professor of Psychology at Williams College
- Awards: Bruno Klopfer Award (2014)

Phebe K. Cramer (December 30, 1935 – April 2, 2021) was an American clinical psychologist who was Professor of Psychology, Emerita at Williams College. She was known for her research on defense mechanisms, body image, and narcissism, and for her creation of a manual for coding defense mechanisms for purposes of psychological testing and personality assessment. Cramer was the 2014 recipient of the Bruno Klopfer Award from the Society for Personality Assessment for lifetime achievement in Personality Psychology.

Cramer was the author of several books including Protecting the Self: Defense Mechanisms in Action (2006), Story Telling, Narrative and the Thematic Apperception Test (1996), The Development of Defense Mechanisms: Theory, Research, and Assessment (1991), and Word Association (1968).

== Biography ==
Cramer received her B.A. from the University of California, Berkeley in 1957. She attended graduate school at New York University where she obtained her Ph.D. in psychology in 1962. Cramer was employed as a clinical psychologist at Maimonides Hospital in Brooklyn from 1962-1963. She was an Assistant Professor of Psychology at Barnard College from 1963-1965, and a visiting Assistant Professor of Psychology at the University of California, Berkeley from 1965-1970. In 1970 she joined the faculty of the Department of Psychology at Williams College where she remained for the rest of her career.

Cramer was the mother of two daughters, Mara and Julia. She died in Pittsfield, Massachusetts on April 2, 2021, at the age of 85.

== Research ==
Cramer was known for her work on personality and longitudinal studies of the development of personal identity from adolescence to adulthood. Some of her most influential work on defense mechanisms utilized the Thematic Apperception Test (TAT). In one study, three defense mechanisms (denial, projection and identification) were examined in four different age groups (preschool, elementary school, early adolescents, and late adolescents) using the TAT. Preschool children were more likely to engage in denial than the other age groups and only minimally used the identification defense mechanism. Elementary school children and early adolescents often used the projection mechanism. In other work, Cramer studied the elements of narcissism in relation to the three ego defense mechanisms in late adolescents entering college. She identified links between usage of the three defense mechanisms and adolescent experiences of identity crisis, but failed to find links between the use of defense mechanisms and narcissism.

== Representative publications ==
- Cramer, P. (1987). The development of defense mechanisms. Journal of Personality, 55(4), 597-614.
- Cramer, P. (1998). Coping and defense mechanisms: What's the difference? Journal of Personality, 66(6), 919-946.
- Cramer, P. (2000). Defense mechanisms in psychology today. Further processes for adaptation. The American Psychologist, 55(6), 637-646.
- Cramer, P. (2000). Development of identity: Gender makes a difference. Journal of Research in Personality, 34(1), 42-72.
- Cramer, P. (2008). Identification and the development of competence: A 44-year longitudinal study from late adolescence to late middle age. Psychology and Aging, 23, 410-421.
- Cramer, P. (2008). Seven pillars of defense mechanism theory. Social and Personality Psychology Compass, 2, 1963-1981.
