= Donald Paterson =

Donald Paterson may refer to:

- Donald Paterson (politician) (1926–1999), Canadian politician
- Donald G. Paterson (1892–1961), American psychologist
- Don Paterson (born 1963), Scottish poet, writer and musician

== See also ==
- Donald Patterson (disambiguation)
- Donald Peterson (disambiguation)
