= Irving B. Weiner =

American psychologist

Irving B. Weiner (d. Nov. 13, 2024) was an American psychologist, past president of Division 12 of the American Psychological Association, and past president of the Society for Personality Assessment. He was the author and editor of many books on psychology.

== Biography ==
Weiner obtained his doctorate in clinical psychology from the University of Michigan. He was a Diplomate of the American Board of Professional Psychology in clinical psychology and forensic psychology. In 1983, he received the Bruno Klopfer Award for Outstanding Lifetime Contribution for "outstanding, long-term professional contribution to the field of personality assessment" from the Society for Personality Assessment. He was the author of many books and articles, and also an active editor of books and book series. He edited the Handbook of Psychology, published in 2003, which is listed in the "Selective Bibliography of Reference Sources in Psychology" for the Psychology Library at Princeton University.

Currently last position was as Clinical Professor of Psychiatry and behavioral Medicine at the University of South Florida in Tampa. He was a licensed psychologist within the state of Florida and practiced clinical and forensic psychology.

== Published works ==
=== Articles ===
- Weiner, Irving B. (August 2001). "Considerations in Collecting Rorschach Reference Data". Journal of Personality Assessment. 77 (1): 122–127. doi:10.1207/S15327752JPA7701_08. PMID 11562097. S2CID 22793342.
- Weiner, Irving B. (April 2000). "Making Rorschach Interpretation as Good as It Can Be". Journal of Personality Assessment. 74 (2): 164–174. doi:10.1207/S15327752JPA7402_2. PMID 10879350. S2CID 28033022.
- Weiner, Iring B. (March 2000). "Using the Rorschach properly in practice and research". Journal of Clinical Psychology. 56 (3): 435–438. doi:10.1002/(SICI)1097-4679(200003)56:3<435::AID-JCLP17>3.0.CO;2-L. PMID 10726676.
- Weiner, Irving B. (1999). "What the Rorschach Can Do for You: Incremental Validity in Clinical. Applications". Assessment. 6 (4): 327–339. doi:10.1177/107319119900600404. PMID 10539980. S2CID 38587696.
- Meloy, J. Reid; Hansen, Trayce L.; Weiner, Irving B. (August 1997). "Authority of the Rorschach: Legal Citations During the Past 50 Years". Journal of Personality Assessment. 69 (1): 53–62. doi:10.1207/s15327752jpa6901_3.
- Weiner, Irving B. (February 1997). "Current Status of the Rorschach Inkblot Method". Journal of Personality Assessment. 68 (1): 5–19. doi:10.1207/s15327752jpa6801_2. PMID 16370768.
- Weiner, Irving B.; Exner Jr, JE; Sciara, A (January 1996). "Is the Rorschach Welcome in the Courtroom?". Journal of Personality Assessment. 67 (2): 422–424. doi:10.1207/s15327752jpa6702_15. PMID 16367684 – via Questia.
- Weiner, Irving B., Exner Jr, John E.; Exner, John (June 1991). "Rorschach Changes in Long-Term Short-Term Psychotherapy". Journal of Personality Assessment. 56 (3): 453–465. doi:10.1207/s15327752jpa5603_7. PMID 16370897.
- Weiner, Irving B. (September 1986). "Conceptual and Empirical Perspectives on the Rorschach Assessment of Psychopathology". Journal of Personality Assessment. 50 (3): 472–479. doi:10.1207/s15327752jpa5003_15. PMID 3806346.
- Weiner, Irving B (March 1983). "Child and Adolescent Psychopathology". Journal of the American Academy of Child and Adolescent Psychiatry. 22 (2): 211. doi:10.1016/S0002-7138(09)62342-6.

=== Books ===
- Weiner, Irving B.; Bornstein, Robert F. (2009). Principles of Psychotherapy: Promoting Evidence-Based Psychodynamic Practice. Wiley. ISBN 978-0-470-12465-9.
- Weiner, Irving B.; Greene, Roger L. (2007). Handbook of Personality Assessment. Wiley. ISBN 978-0-471-22881-3.
- Weiner, Irving B.; Hess, Allen K. (2005). The Handbook of Forensic Psychology (PDF). Wiley. ISBN 978-0-471-69232-4.
- Weiner, Irving B. (2003). Principles of Rorschach Interpretation (Volume in Lea's Personality and Clinical Psychology Series). Lawrence Erlbaum. ISBN 978-0-8058-4232-6.
- Weiner, Irving B. (1997). Psychodiagnosis in Schizophrenia. Lawrence Erlbaum. ISBN 978-0-8058-2578-7.
- Exner, John E., & Weiner, Irving B. (1994) The Rorschach: Assessment of Children and Adolescents v.3: A Comprehensive System. Wiley. ISBN 978-0471559276.
