= Roger L. Greene =

American psychologist

Roger L. Greene is a professor at Palo Alto University. He received the Bruno Klopfer Award in 2010.

He worked on self-report measures of personality, particularly the Minnesota Multiphasic Personality Inventory.
