= Robert R. Holt =

American psychologist (1917–2024)

Robert Rutherford Holt (December 27, 1917 – April 10, 2024) was an American psychologist and peace activist who worked in psychoanalytic theory.

== Life and career ==
Robert Rutherford Holt was born in Jacksonville, Florida, on December 27, 1917. He graduated from The Hill School in 1935. He received a BA in 1939 from Princeton University, and MA in 1941 and a PhD in 1944, both from Harvard University. He directed the Research Center for Mental Health at New York University from 1953 to 1971 and retired from NYU as a professor of psychology emeritus in 1989.

Holt received the Bruno Klopfer Award in 1969. He died in Truro, Massachusetts, on April 10, 2024, at the age of 106.
