= James J. Jenkins =

American psychology professor (1923–2012)

James Jerome Jenkins
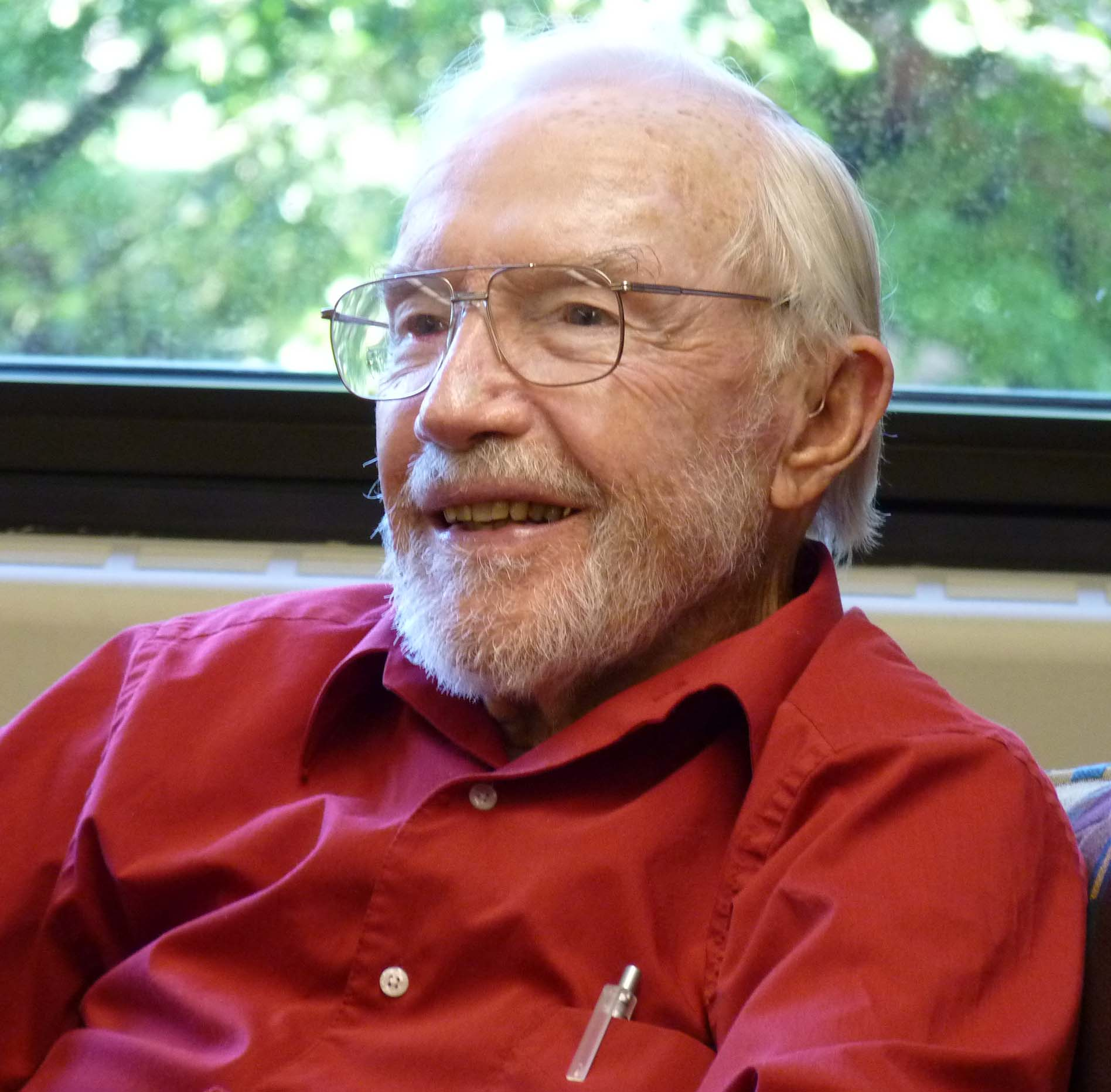
- Born: July 29, 1923; St. Louis, Missouri, U.S.
- Died: November 17, 2012 (aged 89)
- Education: University of Chicago (BS); William Jewell College (BA); University of Minnesota (PhD)
- Scientific career
- Fields: Psycholinguistics
- Workplaces: University of Minnesota, University of South Florida, City University of New York
- Doctoral advisor: Donald G. Paterson

James J. Jenkins (July 29, 1923 – November 17, 2012) was an American psychologist who played a significant role in the development of cognitive psychology.

== Biography ==
Trained as an industrial psychologist, his early career was shaped by his Fellowship at the Social Science Research Council’s 1953 summer meeting that established the discipline of psycholinguistics. He initially attempted to apply a modified version of behaviorism to the problems of language behavior, and while his “mediational” approach was very influential, he became convinced that it could not provide an adequate account of the structural nature of language as articulated by Noam Chomsky. He continued research on language and cognition, eventually focusing on topics concerning speech perception (in collaboration with his wife, Winifred Strange). His research was marked by an interest in new and even radical ideas (e.g., those advocated by James J. Gibson), a keen appreciation of the value of studying real-world problems (as in his early research on aphasia), and a willingness to give up cherished theories when the facts drove him to do so. "If you're not making any progress toward understanding the problem," he said, "you've got to change." He had an infectious enthusiasm for both research and teaching, and his impact on young psychologists was tremendous. He supervised 46 PhD students in his first academic position at the University of Minnesota and through his career served as advisor or co-advisor of 82 PhD's. He is beloved by his students, whom he encouraged to follow their own diverse interests. His students made many important contributions to psychological research (as just one example, the influential work on abstraction in memory done by his students John Bransford and Jeffrey Franks).

== Academic career ==
Jenkins enlisted in the Army in 1942 and was trained as a meteorologist, receiving a B.S. in physics from the University of Chicago in 1944. After serving as a weatherman in the Army Air Forces in the U.S and the South Pacific, he returned to William Jewell College to earn an A.B. in psychology in 1947. He then earned a Ph.D. in psychology at the University of Minnesota in 1950, studying industrial psychology under Donald G. Paterson (who trained even more Ph.D.’s in his career than Jenkins did). He remained at the University of Minnesota as a professor in the Psychology Department from 1950 to 1982. From 1965 to 1973, he was founding Director of the newly established Center for Research in Human Learning of the University of Minnesota, where he remained as Director of Training until 1982. In that year, he moved to the University of South Florida, first as Chair of the Department of Psychology, and then as Distinguished Research Professor until he became Emeritus in 2000. He served as an Adjunct Research Professor at the City University of New York from 2000 through 2008. He was a Fellow at the Center for Advanced Study in the Behavioral Sciences in 1957–58 and 1964–65 (where he and a group of distinguished scholars ended a night-long celebration of their year together by attempting to watch the sun rise over the Pacific Ocean), and a visiting professor at the University of Colorado, Yale University, and the City University of New York.

== Honors and professional activities ==
Jenkins is a Fellow of the American Association for the Advancement of Science, the American Psychological Society/Association for Psychological Science, the American Psychological Association and the Acoustical Society of America. He is a member of the Society of Experimental Psychologists and the Psychonomic Society, the Midwestern and Southeastern Psychological Associations, the Southern Society for Philosophy and Psychology, and the International Society for Ecological Psychology. He served as chairman of the Society of Experimental Psychologists (1972–73), chairman of the Psychonomic Society Board of Governors (1978–79), chairman of the Board of Scientific Affairs of the American Psychological Association (1969–1971), president of the Midwestern Psychological Association (1967–68), president of Division 3 (Experimental) of the American Psychological Association (1973–74), among other contributions to professional societies. He was consulting editor, associate editor, or editor of several major professional journals and member of several NIH and NIE grant panels, member of the National Research Council for four years, and chairman of the Social Science Research Council Committee on Linguistics and Psychology (1960–1962). His academic honors include the previously mentioned Fellowships at the Center for Advanced Study in the Behavioral Sciences and the Social Science Research Council Fellowship at the seminal 1953 Social Science Research Council Summer Institute in Psycholinguistics, as well as an SSRC Faculty Fellowship, a Ford Foundation Faculty Grant, a Citation for Achievement from William Jewell College (1968), a Phi Kappa Phi (University of South Florida Chapter) Artist/Scholar Award (1985), a Sigma Xi (USF Chapter) Outstanding Research Award (1987), and an Outstanding Alumni Achievement Award from the University of Minnesota (2001).

== Selected publications ==
(From over 200 books, chapters, journal articles, and technical reports; see footnote 8 for a complete bibliography).

- Schuell, H., & Jenkins, J. J. (1959). The nature of language deficit in aphasia. Psychological Review, 66, 45–67.
- Jenkins, J. J. (1963). Mediated associations: Paradigms and situations. In C. N. Cofer and B. S. Musgrave (Eds), Verbal behavior and learning. New York: McGraw-Hill. pp. 210–245.
- Greenberg, J. H., & Jenkins, J. J. (1964). Studies in the psychological correlates of the sound system of American English: I. Measuring linguistic distance from English. II. Distinctive features and psychological space. Word, 20, 156–177.
- Jenkins, J. J. (1964). A mediational account of grammatical phenomena. Journal of Communication, 14, 86–97.
- Jenkins, J. J., & Palermo, D. S. (1964). Mediation processes and the acquisition of linguistic structure. In U. Bellugi and R. W. Brown (Eds), The acquisition of language. Monographs of the Society for Research in Child Development, Serial No. 92, 29, No. 1, 141–169.
- Palermo, D. S., & Jenkins, J. J. (1964). Word association norms: Fourth grade through college. Minneapolis, MN: University of Minnesota Press.
- Schuell, H., Jenkins, J. J., & Jimenez-Pabon, E. (1964). The problem of aphasia in adults: Diagnosis, prognosis, and treatment. New York: Hoeber.
- Fodor, J. A., Jenkins, J. J., & Saporta, S. (1967). Psycholinguistics and communication theory. In F. E. X. Dance (Ed.), Human Communication Theory. New York: Holt, Rinehart, & Winston, pp. 160–201. (Precis of a never-published book.)
- Jenkins, J. J., Foss, D. J., & Greenberg, J. H. (1968). Phonological features as cues in learning. Journal of Experimental Psychology, 77, 200–205.
- Dember, W. N., & Jenkins, J. J. (1970). General Psychology: Modeling behavior and experience. Englewood Cliffs, N.J.: Prentice-Hall.
- Halwes, T., & Jenkins, J. J. (1971). The problem of serial order in behavior is not resolved by context-sensitive associative memory models. Psychological Review, 78, 122–129.
- Hyde, T. S., & Jenkins, J. J. (1973). Recall for words as a function of semantic, graphic, and syntactic orienting tasks. Journal of verbal Learning and verbal Behavior, 12, 471–480.
- Jenkins, J. J. (1974). Remember that old theory of memory? Well, forget it! American Psychologist, 29, 785–795.
- Miyawaki, K. M., Strange, W., Verbrugge, R.R., Liberman, A. M, Jenkins, J. J., & Fujimura, O. (1975). An effect of linguistic experience: The discrimination of [r] and [l] by native speakers of Japanese and English. Perception & Psychophysics, 18, 331–340.
- Kraft, R. N., & Jenkins, J. J. (1977). Memory for lateral orientation of slides in picture stories. Memory & Cognition, 5(4), 397–403.
- Jenkins, J.J. (1979). Four points to remember: A tetrahedral model of memory experiments. In L.S. Cermak and F.I.M. Craik (Eds.) Levels of processing in human memory. Hillsdale, N.J.: Erlbaum Associates, pp. 429–446.
- Strange, W., Jenkins, J. J., & Johnson, T. L. (1983). Dynamic specification of coarticulated vowels. Journal of the Acoustical Society of America, 74, 695–705.
- Jenkins, J.J. (1985). Acoustic information for objects, places and events. In W.H. Warren & R.E. Shaw (Eds.) Persistence and change. Hillsdale, N.J.: Erlbaum. 115–138.
- Jenkins, J. J., (1986). Beyond methodolatry. In B. Baars (Ed.), The cognitive revolution in psychology. New York: The Guilford Press, 237–252.
- Jenkins, J.J. (1991). Teaching psychology in large classes: Research and personal experience. Teaching of Psychology, 18, 74–80.
- Jenkins, J. J., Strange, W., & Miranda, S. (1994). Vowel identification in mixed-speaker silent-center syllables. Journal of the Acoustical Society of America, 95, 1030–1043.
- Jenkins, J. J. & Tuten, J. T. (1998). On possible parallels between perceiving and remembering events. In R. R. Hoffman, M. F. Sherrick, & J. S. Warm (Eds.) Viewing psychology as a whole: The integrative science of William N. Dember, Washington, DC: APA Books. pp. 291–314.
- Jenkins, J. J., & Strange, W. (1999). Perception of dynamic information for vowels in syllable onsets and offsets. Perception & Psychophysics, 61, 1200–1210.
