= James N. Butcher =

American psychologist

James N. Butcher is an American psychologist. Butcher was a member of the Department of Psychology at the University of Minnesota until his recent retirement. Butcher received the Bruno Klopfer Award from the Society of Personality Assessment in 2004.

Butcher was chosen by Pearson, the publisher of the Minnesota Multiphasic Personality Inventory, to chair its revision, which he and his co-authors did in the creation of the 2nd revision of the Minnesota Multiphasic Personality Inventory - 2 in 1989.

Butcher graduated from Guilford College (B.A. psychology, 1960) then from the University of North Carolina at Chapel Hill his M.A. in experimental psychology, 1962; and two years later his Ph.D. in clinical psychology. After the awarding of his doctorate, Butcher accepted an offer of a professorship at the University of Minnesota, the institution at which the MMPI had been created, and the one at which Butcher spent his lengthy and productive career. Butcher, along with colleagues like Starke Hathaway and Paul Meehl's doctoral student Alexander B. Caldwell, PhD, ABPP of UCLA constituted along with Roger Greene, PhD. and Grant Dahlstrom, PhD the second generation of MMPI luminaries. Butcher was a genuine "mensch" to his colleagues, and even lauded in the kindest manner in the obituary of American Psychologist Alexander Caldwell, who had a competing interpretation of the MMPI and MMPI-2 and some basic differences on how to approach the instrument. Butcher defended his positions, but also respected his substantial critics [obituary of Alex B. Caldwell, PhD, ABPP, Edward J. Hyman, PhD, ACFP et al., American Psychologist].

Butcher published numerous books and articles on assessment, the MMPI, the MMPI-2 and forensic applications of the MMPI and MMPI-2. Butcher authored or co-authored a variety of MMPI and MMPI-2 measures.
