= Gordon Derner =

American psychologist

Gordon F. Derner (1915–1983) was an American psychologist. He was the dean of the Institute of Advanced Psychological Studies (since renamed after him) at Adelphi University. He received the Bruno Klopfer Award in 1982.

He was born on April 9, 1915, in Buffalo, New York.

He graduated from the State University at Buffalo, and held a master's degree and a doctorate from Columbia University.
