= Yavis =

Subjective categorization of patients with mental disorders

YAVIS (sometimes "YAVIS Syndrome") is an acronym that stands for "young, attractive, verbal, intelligent, and successful." It describes a group of patients that are said to be preferred by mental health professionals. It is based on the perception that this group is characteristically and without external intervention able to form a more positive therapeutic relationship.

== Origin ==
The term was coined by University of Minnesota professor William Schofield in his 1964 book Psychotherapy: The Purchase of Friendship in which he claimed to have demonstrated that mental health professionals often have a positive bias towards clients exhibiting the YAVIS traits. In other words, individuals with these characteristics are assumed to represent a psychotherapist's “ideal patient.” Schofield explained that such a bias may in turn predispose the professional to work harder to help these clients at the expense of the patients who have much greater needs. Such an inclination, although mostly unconscious, was thought to be driven by an expectation that clients with such traits would be motivated to work harder in therapy, thereby increasing the therapist's hope that the treatment would be effective. Asians, for instance, are stereotyped as "inscrutable" making them less preferred than the YAVIS patients. Further, this process would work to enhance the therapist's experience of him/herself as competent, which may help explain why YAVIS clients are unconsciously seen as more desirable.

In a chapter titled "Why I Do Not Attend Case Conferences" of his book Psychodiagnosis: Selected Papers (1973), psychologist Paul Meehl describes several logical fallacies that may arise in the context of medical case conferences, including hidden decisions that health professionals (and people in general) tend to make about others. Meehl discusses YAVIS among the biases that lead to hidden decisions, and he specifically points to the fact that research has shown that clients of a lower socioeconomic status are more likely to receive medication or electroconvulsive or supportive therapy. Middle and upper class clients (or those seen as more “successful”), on the other hand, are more likely to receive intensive, long-term psychotherapy. Meehl outlines that the latter types of treatments are generally more in line with the interests and theoretical frameworks of most practicing psychologists. Meehl uses this example to illustrate that psychotherapists may unknowingly give preferential treatment to clients of higher SES, or individuals with other YAVIS characteristics.

Many psychologists identify that hidden decisions such as YAVIS pose ethical dilemmas when it comes to deciding which treatment options are most appropriate for any given client. Meehl points to the necessity of making such quick decisions due to a lack of resources, and identifies that there simply are not enough practitioners to be able to treat all clients on a long-term basis. He advocates, ideally, for the use of more objective ways in which to make clinical decisions, but he also highlights the practical importance of being aware of YAVIS and the hidden decisions that these biases might elicit.

Some commenters have begun using the acronym HOUND ("Homely, Old, Unsuccessful, Nonverbal, and Dumb") as an antonym.
