= William E. Henry =

American psychologist

William E. Henry (1918–1994) was an American psychologist who worked on projective personality assessment, particularly in relation to executive leadership. He received the Bruno Klopfer Award in 1973.
