= Leona E. Tyler =

American psychologist (1906–1993)

Leona Elizabeth Tyler
- Born: Leona E. Tyler; May 10, 1906; Chetek, Wisconsin, U.S.
- Died: April 29, 1993 (aged 86); Eugene, Oregon, U.S.
- Education: University of Minnesota
- Scientific career
- Fields: Psychology
- Workplaces: University of Oregon
- Doctoral advisor: Donald G. Paterson

Leona Elizabeth Tyler (May 10, 1906 – April 29, 1993) was an American psychologist and president of the American Psychological Association in 1973.

== Early years ==
Leona Tyler was born in Chetek, Wisconsin on May 10, 1906. Her father, Leon M. Tyler was an accountant and house restoration contractor and her mother, Bessie J. Carver Tyler managed the home. Both her parents graduated high school, but neither attended college.

She graduated from high school at the age of fifteen. She received her B.A. in English from the University of Minnesota at the age of 19. Although her major was English, she was also attracted to science. After graduating she taught English and other subjects in junior high schools in Minnesota and Michigan. She completed her Ph.D. in counseling psychology from the University of Minnesota in 1940.

== Academic career ==
Tyler started her university teaching career at the University of Oregon as an instructor in 1940. She joined the Department of Psychology at the University of Oregon in the fall of 1940. She became Dean of the Graduate School in 1965 and remained so until her mandated retirement at the age of 65 in 1971. However, she remained active even after the retirement. She remained at the University of Oregon till her death in 1993.

== Work ==
Tyler conducted several researches and published many books and research papers on psychology. She focused on the construct of organized choices in the late 1950s. Her concerns about vocational interests led to a longitudinal study of the broader question of the directions of development that interests and personality take. A major research finding was that, as people thought about careers, dislikes and avoidances were more important than likes. This research led to the study of how choices organized peoples' lives. She developed the Choice Pattern Technique, that required people to indicate their construals of occupations and free-time activities. In 1962, she received the Fulbright scholarship to work at the University of Amsterdam. This allowed her to test her ideas and methods cross-culturally. Her research was extended to India and Australia and expanded to take in values, daily activities, and future time-perspectives in adolescents. Her work in the Choice Pattern Technique was included in The Work of the Counselor.

In 1947, she wrote The Psychology of Human Differences. She developed her own view of behavior. She began blending concepts of Carl Rogers, individual differences, and psychometrics, psychoanalytic theory, behaviorism, developmental stage theory, and existentialism. Her thinking shifted from behavioristic to cognitive during this time. In 1969, Tyler wrote The Work of the Counselor. From 1967 to 1968, she wrote the latest revision of Developmental Psychology with Florence Goodenough. She applied her theory of possibilities to the choice behavior of scientists in Thinking Creatively in 1983. This suggested perceptions of choices for scientific inquiry are distorted or limited by professional education and discipline based on conformity.

== Death ==
Leona died on April 29, 1993, at the age of 86, in Eugene, Oregon because of congestive heart failure after a series of illnesses and accidents.

== Books and other publications ==
The following are the books and other publications by Tyler.

- Tyler, L. E. (1941). The measured interests of adolescent girls. Journal of Educational Psychology, 32, 561-572.
- Tyler, L. E. (1945). Relationships between Strong Vocational Interest scores and other attitude and personality factors. Journal of Applied Psychology, 29, 58-67.
- Tyler, L. E. (1953). The Work of the Counselor. New York: Appleton-Century-Crofts, Inc.
- Tyler, L. (1956). The initial interview. Personnel and Guidance Journal, 34, 466-473.
- Tyler, L. E. (1959). Toward a workable psychology of individuality. American Psychologist, 14, 75-81.
- Tyler, L. E. (1965). The psychology of human differences (3rd ed). New York: Appleton-Century-Crofts/Prentice-Hall. (Also published in 1947 and 1956).
- Tyler, L. E.(1969). An approach to public affairs: Report of the Ad Hoc Committee on Public Affairs. American Psychologist, 24, 1-4.
- Tyler, L. E. (1969). Intelligence: Some recurring issues. New York: Van Nostrand.
- Tyler, L. E. (1978). Individuality: Human possibilities and personal choice in the psychological development of men and women. San Francisco: Jossey- Bass.
- Tyler, L. E. (1979). Test and measurements (3rd ed). Englewood Cliffs, N.J.: Prentice-Hall. (Also published in 1963 and 1961).
- Tyler, L. E. (1983). Thinking Creatively: A New Approach to Psychology and Individual Lives.
