= René V. Dawis =

American psychologist (1928–2026)

- Born: René V. Dawis; December 29, 1928
- Died: January 11, 2026 (aged 97); Prospect Park, Minneapolis, U.S.
- Citizenship: United States
- Education: University of Minnesota
- Awards: Leona Tyler Award (1999)
- Scientific career
- Fields: Differential psychology, Counseling psychology
- Workplaces: University of the Philippines, University of Minnesota
- Doctoral advisor: Donald G. Paterson

René V. Dawis (December 29, 1928 – January 11, 2026) was an American psychology professor. He taught at the University of Minnesota and was professor emeritus until his death. His work focused on individual differences, work adjustment, and human potential. He received the American Psychological Associations's Leona Tyler Award in 1999.

== Career ==
Dawis received his MA in 1955 and his PhD in 1956.

At the University of Minnesota he was director of the Counseling Psychology Program from 1975 to 1985. Since 1997, he has been emeritus psychology at the same university.

In 1995, he was a signatory of a collective statement in response to The Bell Curve titled "Mainstream Science on Intelligence", written by Intelligence editor Linda Gottfredson and published in the Wall Street Journal.

He was a principal investigator into several projects at the Industrial Relations Center at the Carlson School of Management.

== Death ==
Dawis died on January 11, 2026, at the age of 97.

== Publications ==
- Dawis RV (1989). Psychology: Human relations and work adjustment. Gregg Division, McGraw-Hill; 7th ed edition ISBN 0-07-022546-X.
- Lubinski D, et al. (1995). Assessing Individual Differences in Human Behavior: New Concepts, Methods, and Findings. Davies-Black Publishing; 1st edition. ISBN 0-89106-072-3.
- Dawis RV (1984). A psychological theory of work adjustment: An individual-differences model and its applications. University of Minnesota Press. ISBN 0-8166-1316-8.
- Dawis RV et al. (1988). Psychology: Behavior, Motivation, and Work Adjustment. Paradigm Publishing 7th edition. ISBN 1-56118-477-2.
- Fruehling RT, Dawis RV (1995). Psychology: Realizing Human Potential. Paradigm Publishing. ISBN 1-56118-342-3.
- Lofquist LH, Dawis RV (1991). Essentials of Person-Environment-Correspondence Counseling. University of Minnesota Press. ISBN 0-8166-1889-5.
