= Constance T. Fischer =

Psychologist

- Education: University of Oklahoma, University of Kentucky
- Known for: Psychological Assessment
- Scientific career
- Fields: Psychology
- Workplaces: Duquesne University

Constance Taylor Fischer is a psychologist and retired as Professor Emeritus at Duquesne University, best known for her work on individualized psychological assessment.

== Early life ==
Constance T. Fischer was born in Oahu, Hawaii in 1938.

== Education and career ==
She received her B.A. degree in Political Science from the University of Oklahoma in 1960. In 1963, she graduated the University of Kentucky with a M.A in Psychology. Fischer received her PhD in Clinical Psychology from the University of Kentucky as well, in 1966. She is a Professor Emeritus at Duquesne University in Pittsburgh, Pennsylvania.

== Awards and honors ==
In 2005, Fischer was awarded the Carl Rogers Award, which is awarded for "an outstanding contribution to the theory and practice of humanistic psychology". Awarded the Bruno Klopfer Award in 2006.

== Works ==
- Individualizing Psychological Assessment (1985)
- On the Way to Collaborative Psychological Assessment (2017)
- Client Participation in Human Services: The Prometheus Principle
- The Qualitative Vision for Psychology
