= Albert I. Rabin =

American-Lithuanian psychologist

Albert I. Rabin (June 20, 1912 – October 24, 2010) was an American-Lithuanian psychologist.

Rabin was born in Merkinė, Lithuania, and moved to the United States in 1930. He graduated from Boston University and Harvard University, receiving his Ph.D. in psychology in 1938. He was hired by the New Hampshire State Hospital in 1939 as its chief psychologist. While there, he met Beatrice Marceau, who became his wife in 1949, the year he became a psychology professor at Michigan State University. He won the Bruno Klopfer Award in 1977

Rabin retired from MSU in 1982, continued teaching in San Diego and Berkeley, California until the 1990s and died on October 24, 2010, age 98.

== Bibliography ==
- Growing up in the Kibbutz
- Projective Techniques for Adolescents and Children
- Twenty Years Later: Kibbutz Children
- Psychological Issues in Biblical Lore
- Clinical Psychology: Issues of the Seventies
- Kibbutz Studies: A Digest of Books and Articles of the Kibbutz
- Assessment with Projective Techniques: A Concise Introduction
