= Zygmunt A. Piotrowski =

Polish-born American psychologist (1904–1985)

Zygmunt A. Piotrowski (1904–1985) was a Polish born American psychologist who worked on the Rorschach test. He received the Bruno Klopfer Award in 1971 and the Award for Distinguished Professional Contributions from the American Psychological Association in 1980.

== Early life ==
Piotrowski was born in Poznań on April 18, 1904. He attended the St. Mary Magdalen Gymnasium and then the Adam Mickiewicz University in Poznań. He studied psychology, the history of philosophy, and symbolic logic and received a PhD in 1927. He did postgraduate study at Columbia University starting in 1928, then from 1934 to 1954 worked at the New York Psychiatric Institute, which was affiliated with Columbia.

He married Halina Chybowska. They had one child.

== Rorschach test research ==
In the 1937, Piotrowski published research on ten indicators, found using Rorschach tests, that indicate the presence of organic brain disease. These have since been called Piotrowski signs. He developed a method of analysis for the Rorschach test he termed perceptanalysis, which emphasized perception of the images rather than secondary associations.
