= Marvin Dunnette =

American psychologist (1926–2007)

- Born: Marvin D. Dunnette; September 30, 1926; Austin, Minnesota, U.S.
- Died: September 18, 2007 (aged 80)
- Education: University of Minnesota
- Known for: Handbook of Industrial and Organizational Psychology
- Scientific career
- Fields: Industrial and organizational psychology, Differential psychology
- Workplaces: University of Minnesota
- Doctoral advisor: Donald G. Paterson

Marvin D. Dunnette (30 September 1926 – 18 September 2007) was an American psychology professor and one of the key figures in the history of industrial and organizational psychology.

== Early life ==
He was born in Austin, Minnesota, to active Methodists Rodney and Mildred (née Notestine). Rodney was a lawyer who fought successfully for equal pay for women before the Minnesota Supreme Court. Mildred was a member of the Women's Christian Temperance Union, and Marvin consecrated as a "White Ribbon Baby" who did not taste "demon rum" until he was 25 and halfway through graduate school.

A case of polio when he was six years old proved to be non-paralytic, but he (and his mother) were quarantined for some time. In high school, he ran track, played intramural basketball, acted in school plays and played clarinet in the school marching band.

After high school graduation in 1944, he joined the US Marine Corps (following his father who had served as a Marine in World War I before becoming a lawyer). Despite color blindness he was enrolled in an officer training program and sent to the University of California, Berkeley. At war's end, he returned to Minnesota and with the help of the GI Bill, graduated from the University of Minnesota with a degree in chemical engineering in 1948. He worked as a chemist for some years but found it unfulfilling. Intending to enter law school and join father's practice, he found a job counseling engineering students on probation which required that he enroll in a course in vocational and occupational therapy with Donald G. Paterson (1892-1961). He fell in love with psychology, abandoned his legal studies and earned a Ph.D. in industrial psychology in 1954 by developing the Minnesota Engineering Analogies Test as his doctoral dissertation requirement. This test was published and marketed by the Psychological Corporation, now Harcourt Assessment that same year.

== Psychology career ==
Dunnette spent two years at Minnesota's Industrial Relations Center where he studied test measurements for the US Air Force, built a scale designed to measure attitudes about unions and membership in unions and developed job satisfaction surveys. His principle finding in all three projects was that, even in autonomous tests, results depended on who administered the survey.

During five productive years at 3M Company as manager of employee relations research, he conducted research and published widely. When his University of Minnesota mentor D.G. Paterson retired, Dunnette was invited to the post of associate professor to take the industrial psychology part of Patterson's work, leaving counseling psychology and differential psychology to other of Patterson's 83 former PhD students, as part of a plan agreed by the university's Department of Psychology prior to his joining 3M.

In 1966/7, he was president of the industrial psychology section of the American Psychological Association. In 1967, Dunnette co-founded Personnel Decisions Inc., and eight years later, cofounded a nonprofit organization, Personnel Decisions Research Institute (now a for-profit operation).

In addition to 3M, his clients included IBM, Honeywell, Sears, Caterpillar, Ford Motor Company, Office of Naval Research, US Marine Corps, the Law Enforcement Assistance Administration, the National Institute on Drug Abuse and others. He published over 65 articles, chapters and books. Perhaps his best known book is the Handbook of Industrial and Organizational Psychology published in 1976 by Rand McNally.

In 1994 he was one of 52 signatories on “Mainstream Science on Intelligence,” a public statement written by Linda Gottfredson, published in response to popular criticism of the conclusions presented in the controversial book The Bell Curve.

== Works ==
- — (1953). "The Minnesota Engineering Analogies Test". Journal of Applied Psychology. 37 (3). American Psychological Association (APA): 170–175. doi:10.1037/h0056333. ISSN 1939-1854.
- Personnel Selection and Placement, 1966
- Handbook of Industrial and Organizational Psychology, 1976
- Managerial behavior, performance and effectiveness, 1970 with Campbell, J. P., Dunnette, M. D., Lawler, E. E. III, & Weick, K. E. Jr. New York: McGraw-Hill.
