= Stephen A. Appelbaum =

American psychologist

Stephen A. Appelbaum (1926–2000) was an American psychologist. He received his PhD from Boston University and the Bruno Klopfer Award in 1985.
