= Piotrowski signs =

Signs of brain disease

Piotrowski signs are ten signs of organic brain disease that can be found from having patients analyze Rorschach tests. They were identified by Zygmunt Piotrowski, who analyzed the Rorschach test interpretations of patients with organic brain disease, central nervous system diseases (non-cerebral), and conversion disorder. He found that the patients with cortical-subcortical damage (those with organic brain disease) had interpretations that were more abnormal than those with non-cerebral organic abnormalities and conversion disorder.

== History and development ==
In Piotrowski's initial exploration of personality changes in organic brain disease, he discerned 10 signs that suggested cerebral organic damage. This conclusion was drawn from an analysis of Rorschach records encompassing 18 cases of organic cerebral involvement, 10 cases of non-cerebral nervous system involvement, and 5 cases of conversion hysteria. The Piotrowski signs have since evolved as valuable tools in clinical practice. Piotrowski's work in the field of diagnostic medicine aimed to create a standardised set of observable signs that could enhance the accuracy and efficiency of medical assessments.

== Key Piotrowski signs ==
The Piotrowski Signs encompass a range of physical and clinical indicators that may manifest in patients with specific medical conditions. While the signs are diverse, they share the commonality of offering valuable insights into the patient's health status. These signs may involve distinctive patterns of movement, palpation, or other observable characteristics that aid in differential diagnosis.

== Clinical applications ==
Healthcare professionals across various medical specialties employ Piotrowski signs as part of their diagnostic toolkit. These signs have proven particularly valuable in fields such as neurology, orthopedics, and internal medicine. By recognizing and interpreting these signs, physicians can refine their diagnostic assessments and tailor treatment plans to the individual needs of the patient.

=== Piotrowski signs in practice ===
In neurology, certain observed movements or reflexes may indicate specific neurological conditions. For example, a particular pattern of eye movement may suggest a neurological disorder, guiding further investigation. In orthopedics, signs related to joint movement or palpation can aid in identifying musculoskeletal issues. These signs may be crucial in diagnosing conditions such as joint instability or ligament damage.

Limitations

While Piotrowski signs contribute significantly to the diagnostic process, they are not without limitations as the interpretation of these signs can be subjective, requiring skilled and experienced clinicians for accurate assessment. Moreover, some signs may overlap with manifestations of different conditions, necessitating a comprehensive clinical evaluation. However, despite myriad criticisms, it appears to be the most effective among existing Rorschach techniques for detecting brain damage.
