= Jerry S. Wiggins =

American personality and clinical psychologist (1931-2006)

- Born: 1931
- Died: 2006 (aged 74–75)
- Occupation: Clinical psychologist
- Known for: Writings on personality theory and psychometrics
- Awards: Bruno Klopfer Award (2002)

Jerry S. Wiggins (1931–2006) was an American personality and clinical psychologist known for developing scales to assess the traits in the circumplex model, writing and editing texts on personality theory and psychometrics and for developing measures of interpersonal behavior.

Wiggins was one of the most prominent advocates of circular representations of personality and he formalized the circular model (also called circumplex model) with modern statistical techniques. Wiggins started with the lexical assumption - (the idea that all important individual differences are encoded within the natural language). But he went further in his effort at taxonomy by arguing that trait terms specify different kinds of ways in which individuals differ. Wiggins was most concerned primarily with interpersonal traits and carefully separated these from other categories of traits.

In 2004, the journal Multivariate Behavioral Research published a special edition entitled ‘Personality Topics in Honor of Jerry S. Wiggins’ which was guest edited by Lewis R Goldberg. As well as including references to Dr Wiggins' circumplex models it made particular reference to his contributions to the Minnesota Multiphasic Personality Inventory (MMPI) His work was also mentioned following his death in the newsletter for the professional society he helped found, the Society for Interpersonal Theory and Research.
