= Samuel Jacob Beck =

American psychologist

- Born: 1896
- Died: 1980 (aged 83–84)
- Education: Columbia University

Samuel Jacob Beck (1896–1980) was an American psychologist who worked on personality assessment and the Rorschach test.

He graduated from Harvard in 1926 and then attended Columbia University, where received his M.A. in 1927 and Ph.D. in 1932. He received the Bruno Klopfer Award in 1965.

He was the first person in America to write a research paper on the Rorschach test, with a publication in 1930, and was a foremost expert on the topic. In 1947 he assisted Douglas Kelley in the interpretation of Rorschach test results from Nazi leaders taken by Kelley during the Nuremberg War Trials.
