= Bruno Klopfer =

Bavarian-born German psychologist

Bruno Klopfer (1 October 1900 – 23 October 1971) was a German psychologist, born in Bavaria.

He had a profound impact on the development of psychological personality testing, and was an important pioneer and innovator in the development, scoring and popularization of projective techniques, especially the Rorschach inkblot test.

== Career ==
He was awarded a Ph.D. from the Ludwig-Maximilians-Universität München in 1923.

Klopfer, a Jew, left Germany in 1933; and on his way to the US, spent a year in Switzerland where he studied with Carl Jung at the Zurich Psychotechnic Institute (this was where he first encountered the Rorschach test).

His first job in the USA was at Columbia University where he conducted research with the famous anthropologist Franz Boas.

He was founding editor of the Rorschach Research Exchange and Journal of Projective Techniques in 1936. This journal became the "Journal of Projective Techniques" in 1950, The Journal of Projective Techniques & Personality Assessment in 1963, and eventually became the Journal of Personality Assessment in 1971.

He was the director of the Rorschach Institute from 1939 to 1947, and was the president of the Society of Projective Techniques from 1947 until his death in 1971.

In 1947, he was appointed clinical professor of psychology at the University of California at Los Angeles. He remained at UCLA until he retired in 1963.

Klopfer performed workshops on the interpretation of the Rorschach test. Mary Ainsworth, a major contributor to the development of attachment theory, attended one of these workshops. The meeting led to Klopfer and Ainsworth collaborating to coauthor a book on the Rorschach technique

During World War II, United States Army Medical Corps chief psychiatrist Douglas Kelley, Klopfer's close colleague, and psychologist Gustave Gilbert administered the Rorschach test to the 22 defendants in the Nazi leadership group prior to the first Nuremberg trials, and the test scores were published some decades later.

== Works ==
- "Psychological Variables in Human Cancer", Journal of Projective Techniques, vol. 21, no. 4 (December 1957), pp. 331–340. (This paper is also significant because it contains an account of the impact of the treatment of a lymphosarcoma upon a patient of one of Klopfer's colleagues (Philip West) with a bogus medicine, Krebiozen. Klopfer's account of Wright's progress is often referred to in the cancer literature, but the actual reference is seldom cited.)
- The Rorschach Technique: A Manual for a Projective Method of Personality Diagnosis, World Book Co, (Yonkers-on-Hudson), 1946.
- With Ainsworth, M.D., Klopfer, W.G. & Holt, R.R., Developments in the Rorschach Technique: Vol.1, Technique and Theory, World Book Co, (Yonkers-on-Hudson), 1954.
- With Ainsworth, M.D., Klopfer, W.G. & Holt, R.R.(eds.), Developments in the Rorschach Technique: Vol.2, Fields of Application, World Book Co, (Yonkers-on-Hudson), 1956.
- With & Davidson, H.H., The Rorschach Technique; an Introductory Manual, Harcourt, Brace & World, (New York), 1962.
- With Meyer, M., Brawer, F. & Klopfer, W.G. (eds.), Developments in the Rorschach Technique: Vol.3, Aspects of Personality Structure, Harcourt Brace Jovanovich, (New York), 1970.
