= Donald Patterson (Pennsylvania politician) =

- Born: 1935 or 1936
- Died: December 6, 2016 (aged 80); Absecon, New Jersey
- Spouse: Elaine M. Patterson
- Children: 4

Donald L. Patterson (1935/1936 – 6 December 2016) was the Pennsylvania Inspector General under Governor Ed Rendell from 2003 to 2011. He had previously been a member of the Green Berets and a paratrooper of the 82nd Airborne Division.

Patterson was married to Elaine M. Patterson for 63 years until his death. The couple had four children.
