= Winifred Strange =

Speech scientist (1945-2024)

- Occupations: Professor Emerita - City University of New York, Graduate Center
- Spouse: James J. Jenkins
- Awards: Silver Medal from the Acoustical Society of America

Academic background
- Education: University of Minnesota, Ph.D

Academic work
- Discipline: Cross-language speech perception, Speech sounds in second-language acquisition
- Institutions: City University of New York, Graduate Center

Winifred "Pinky" Strange (March 5, 1945 - January 25, 2024) was a speech scientist and scholar known for her work on phonetics in second-language acquisition. Strange held multiple faculty positions before retiring as Professor Emerita in Speech-Languages-Hearing Sciences at the City University of New York (CUNY), Graduate Center in 2010. She received the 2008 Acoustical Society of America Silver Medal in Speech Communication in recognition of her research contributions to understanding speech perception.

== Biography ==
Winifred Strange was born in Red Bluff, California on March 5, 1945 and grew up with her two parents and older sister who gave her the nickname "Pinky". Strange attended Chico State College in California for her undergraduate degree then completed her Ph.D in psychology at the University of Minnesota in 1972.

Strange started her career as a faculty member at the University of Minnesota, where she worked with renowned scholars like James J. Jenkins (her husband) and Donald Shankweiler, researching how the sounds surrounding vowels influence listeners' ability to understand them. She and Jenkins worked together as faculty at the University of South Florida before she moved to the CUNY Graduate Center in 1998. During her career, Strange received more than 20 federally funded grants from organizations like the National Institute of Health (NIH) and the National Science Foundation (NSF), which she used to mentor more than 50 graduate students and colleagues. Strange's research focused on second-language acquisition, with her most notable contributions dealing with the ways in which non-native speakers understand familiar and unfamiliar sounds. Strange continued collaborating on research with colleagues well after her retirement in 2010, with her last publication being in 2021.

Strange held various roles at the Acoustical Society of America, being elected fellow of the organization in 1992, and serving as Member of Executive Council, member of the Speech Technical Committee, and member of the 75th Anniversary Celebration Committee. Strange also served as Associate Editor for the Journal of the Acoustical Society of America.

Strange was known for her commitment to work-life balance, as she loved the opera, meditation, and tap dancing, and opened the Monarch Arts Dance Studio in Bradenton, Florida shortly before her passing. Strange was remembered as vibrant and down-to-earth, with a contagious passion that inspired many around her.

== Research ==
Strange developed the Automatic Selective Perception Model (ASP), which explains that adult language learners need to pay closer attention to sounds not found in their native language than sounds found in their native language. Used in practice, ASP suggests that while adult learners can learn sounds not found in their native language, they will need to use more energy to do so, which in turn will make it more difficult to focus on other the grammar and structural parts of the new language. This model gives language learners and teachers insight into what influences or hinders second language development, as well as what learners need to focus on for language growth. Additionally, Strange's research on perceptual assimilation concluded that second language learners categorize new vowel sounds using: sounds found in their native language, the rhythmic context of the vowel, and whether or not the vowel is used in a sentence. This research highlighted the importance of context for second language acquisition.

Other key research includes Strange's work on coarticulated vowels, where she found that participants were able to identify accents and vowels, even when the middle vowel sound was removed. This research showed that identification of vowel sound was not solely based on the actual vowel sound itself, but also on the length of the sound as well as the sounds right before and after the vowels, challenging the Static Target Theory that states vowels are identified by the stable middle sound.

== Representative publications ==
- Best, C. T., & Strange, W. (1992). Effects of phonological and phonetic factors on cross-language perception of approximants. Journal of Phonetics, 20(3), 305-330. https://doi/org/10.1016/S0095-4470(19)30637-0
- Levy, E. S., & Strange, W. (2008). Perception of French vowels by American English adults with and without French language experience. Journal of Phonetics, 36(1), 141-157. https://doi.org/10.1016/j.wocn.2007.03.001
- Strange, W. (2011). Automatic selective perception (ASP) of first and second language speech: A working model. Journal of Phonetics, 39(4), 456–466. https://doi.org/10.1016/j.wocn.2010.09.001
- Strange, W., Akahane-Yamada, R., Kubo, R., Trent, S. A., Nishi, K., & Jenkins, J. J. (1998). Perceptual assimilation of American English vowels by Japanese listeners. Journal of Phonetics, 26(4), 311-344. https://doi.org/10.1006/jpho.1998.0078
- Strange, W., Jenkins, J. J., & Johnson, T. L. (1983). Dynamic specification of coarticulated vowels. The Journal of the Acoustical Society of America, 74(3), 695–705. https://doi.org/10.1121/1.423299

== Books ==
- Strange, W. (Ed.). (1995). Speech perception and linguistic experience: Issues in cross-language research. York Press.
