= Kenneth MacCorquodale =

American psychologist

Kenneth MacCorquodale (June 26, 1919 - February 28, 1986) was an American psychologist who played a major role in developing scientifically validated operant conditioning methods. He was a student of B. F. Skinner at the University of Minnesota.
