= Martin Mayman =

American psychologist

Martin Mayman (1924–1999) was an American psychologist who worked with the Rorschach test. He received his B.S. degree in 1943 from the City College of New York, his M.S. in 1947 from New York University and his Ph.D. in 1953 from the University of Kansas.

He received the Bruno Klopfer Award in 1981.
