= David L. Shapiro =

American psychologist and author (born 1943)

- Born: David L. Shapiro; June 13, 1943 (age 83); Boston, Massachusetts, U.S.
- Education: Harvard University (B.A.); University of Michigan (M.A.); University of Michigan (Ph.D.)
- Occupations: Forensic psychologist, clinical researcher, author
- Years active: 1965–present
- Website: drdavidshapiro.com

David L. Shapiro (born 13 June, 1943) is an American psychologist and author. He is known for his expertise in psychological evaluations for court cases, competency assessments, risk assessment, and criminal responsibility.

Shapiro has worked on high-profile cases, offering expert testimony and carrying out assessments that inform court decisions. When his first book on forensic assessment was published in 1983, it was regarded as the first to contextualize practical issues rather than theoretical foundations.

In 1986, Shapiro served as the President of the American Academy of Forensic Psychology. He is a fellow of the American Psychological Association. He has also chaired numerous ethics committees and editorial boards of scholarly journals. Shapiro is Professor Emeritus at Nova Southeastern University.

== History ==
Shapiro was born in Boston, Massachusetts. In 1965, he graduated from Harvard University with a B.A. in Social Relations. In 1968, Shapiro graduated with an M.A. at the University of Michigan. He obtained his Ph.D. in Clinical Psychology in 1972 from the University of Michigan. Following his doctoral studies, Shapiro worked as a psychology consultant for the Taylor Manor Hospital in Maryland in 1980, as well as the United States Secret Service in 1981.

Shapiro’s early contributions, including his textbooks and clinical expertise, helped define forensic psychology as a specialized discipline. His role in developing best practices for forensic assessments and advancing the ethical standards of forensic psychology solidified his reputation. Shapiro is recognized for his academic work, including publications that have shaped the understanding of forensic psychology practices. His books and articles often focus on the ethical challenges and methodologies in the field, bridging the gap between psychological research and its practical application in legal settings.

Shapiro has served on the editorial board for the Journal of Child Custody, the Journal of Family Violence, and the Journal of Criminal Psychology. He is a founding member of the American Board of Forensic Psychology.

== Current & Former Tenures ==
- Fellow, American Psychological Association
- Chair, Ethics Committee - Maryland Psychological Association
- Chair, Board of Ethical Affairs, Maryland Psychological Association
- Diplomate in Forensic Psychology, American Board of Professional Psychology
- Chair, Ethics Committee, American Board of Professional Psychology
- Board of Directors, American Board of Forensic Psychology
- Member, Ethics Committee, American Psychological Association
- Member, Board of Trustees, American Board of Professional Psychology
- President, Division 46, American Psychological Association
- President, American Academy of Forensic Psychology
- Membership Chair, National Academies of Practice
- Chair of Ethics, Broward County Chapter, Florida Psychological Association

== Honors ==
- Distinguished Contribution to Forensic Psychology, 1986
- Distinguished Practitioner in Psychology, National Academies of Practice, 2000
- Distinguished Contribution to Psychology, California Psychological Association, 2001
