= Morris Krugman =

American psychologist

Morris Krugman (1899–1993) was an American psychologist.

He was born in Białystok and came to New York City as a young child. He received his bachelor's degree from Brooklyn Polytechnic and a master's and doctorate from New York University.

He became the inaugural president of the Society for Personality Assessment (then The Rorschach Institute) in 1939.
