= Donald R. Peterson =

Donald R. Peterson (September 10, 1923 – November 2, 2007) was professor emeritus of psychology at Rutgers University. Peterson was notable for advocating for a professional doctorate exclusive to professional psychologists, eventually leading to establishment of the Doctor of Psychology degree and programs. Establishing this degree as the standard doctorate for practicing psychologists was not embraced by most psychologists, who were concerned programs would abandon scientific principles in the name of greater clinical training.

== Works ==
- Depression Volume 1 (2020). Peterson, Donald R.; Birashk, Behrooz; Jahangiri, Hamideh; Scholar's Press. ISBN 978-613-8-94364-8
- Depression Volume 2 (2020).Peterson, Donald R.; Birashk, Behrooz; Jahangiri, Hamideh; Scholar's Press. ISBN 978-613-8-94366-2
- Depression Volume 3 (2020). Peterson, Donald R.; Birashk, Behrooz; Jahangiri, Hamideh; Scholar's Press. ISBN 978-613-8-94372-3
- Depression Volume 4 (2020). Peterson, Donald R.; Birashk, Behrooz; Jahangiri, Hamideh; Scholar's Press. ISBN 978-613-8-94376-1
- Donald R. Peterson (2005). Twelve Years of Correspondence with Paul Meehl: Tough Notes from a Gentle Genius. Mahwah, N.J.: Lawrence Erlbaum Associates.
- Donald R. Peterson. (1997). Educating Professional Psychologists: History and Guiding Conception. Washington, D.C.: APA Books.
- Harold H. Kelly, Donald R. Peterson, et al. (1983). Close Relationships.
- Donald R. Peterson. (1968) The Clinical Study of Social Behavior. Englewood Cliffs, N.J.: Prentice Hall.
