= Harrison G. Gough =

American psychologist (1921–2014)

- Born: February 25, 1921; Buffalo, Minnesota, US
- Died: 4 May 2014 (aged 93); Pebble Beach, California, US
- Education: University of Minnesota
- Known for: California Psychological Inventory, Personality
- Awards: Jack Block Award by the Society for Personality and Social Psychology (2005), Bruno Klopfer Award (1987)
- Scientific career
- Fields: Psychology
- Workplaces: University of California, Berkeley
- Doctoral advisor: Paul E. Meehl
- Doctoral students: Thomas J. Bouchard

Harrison G. Gough (1921–2014) was an American psychologist and pioneer of personality assessment. Over the course of his career he developed more than 30 personality tests and instruments, including the California Psychological Inventory. Gough published over 200 research papers, books, chapters, manuals and reviews, and received numerous awards, including the Bruno Klopfer Award in 1987, in his lifetime.

Gough received a Bachelor of Arts in sociology in 1942, his Master's in 1947, and his Ph.D. in 1949, all from the University of Minnesota. His Ph.D. advisor was Paul E. Meehl. After the completion of his Ph.D., Gough served on the Department of Psychology faculty at the University of California, Berkeley, until his retirement in 1986.

During World War II Gough served in the U.S. military as an armed forces psychologist, where he was assigned to the Air Crew Selection Program. It was here that Gough learned of the utility of psychological assessment tools. After developing the California Psychological Inventory assessment in 1956, Gough remarked that his primary goal was to meet the aviation selection program's high psychometric standards. Later in his armed forces tenure he was assigned to a military hospital as a clinical psychologist.

== Personal life ==
He married Kathryn Whittier in January 1943. They had one daughter.
