= Journal of Personality Assessment =

- Discipline: Clinical psychology Personality psychology
- Language: English
- Edited by: Martin Sellbom

Publication details
- Former name(s): Journal of Projective Techniques and Personality Assessment, Journal of Projective Techniques, Rorschach Research Exchange and Journal of Projective Techniques, Rorschach Research Exchange
- History: 1936–present
- Publisher: Taylor and Francis on behalf of the Society for Personality Assessment
- Frequency: Bimonthly
- Impact factor: 2.8 (2023)

Standard abbreviations
- ISO 4: J. Pers. Assess.

Indexing
- ISSN: 0022-3891 (print); 1532-7752 (web)
- LCCN: 75649525
- OCLC no.: 732865561

Links
- Journal homepage; Online access; Online archive

The Journal of Personality Assessment is a bimonthly peer-reviewed academic journal covering research on measurement issues in the fields of personality and clinical psychology that was established in 1936. It is published by Taylor and Francis on behalf of the Society for Personality Assessment. The editor-in-chief is Martin Sellbom (University of Otago, New Zealand) since 2018. According to the Journal Citation Reports, the journal has a 2023 impact factor of 2.8.
