= Donald G. Paterson =

American psychologist (1892–1961)

- Born: Donald Gildersleeve Paterson; 18 January 1892; Columbus, Ohio
- Died: 4 October 1961 (aged 69); Minneapolis, Minnesota
- Citizenship: United States
- Education: Ohio State University
- Known for: Individual Differences, Applied Psychology, Industrial/Organizational Psychology
- Scientific career
- Fields: Psychology
- Workplaces: University of Kansas, University of Minnesota
- Doctoral advisor: Rudolf Pintner
- Doctoral students: Marvin Dunnette, James J. Jenkins, Leona E. Tyler, John G. Darley, René V. Dawis

Donald Gildersleeve Paterson (January 18, 1892 – October 4, 1961) was an American psychologist known for pioneering applied psychology, in particular vocational counseling, industrial/organizational psychology, and differential psychology in the United States. He was a professor of psychology at the Department of Psychology at the University of Minnesota from 1921 to 1960.

== Biography ==
Paterson was born in Columbus, Ohio, the youngest of five children. His father and mother were both completely deaf as a result of childhood illness. Paterson obtained his undergraduate and graduate training at Ohio State University. He became an instructor in psychology at the University of Kansas, where he met his wife, Margaret Young. During World War I he served as Chief Psychological Examiner and a captain in the Sanitary Corp of the US Army. After the war he joined the Scott Company, an early type of psychological consulting organizations. In 1921 Paterson joined the faculty at the University of Minnesota, where he worked until his retirement in 1960. Paterson had two children, Philip Paterson and Mrs. Robert C. Becker.

Paterson was a founder and president of the American Association for Applied Psychology, which lasted for 8 years from 1937 to 1945, until it was merged with the American Psychological Association (APA). In that sense, it served as the precursor to the multiple divisions of applied psychology within the APA, including clinical, consulting, educational, industrial/organizational, and military psychology. Paterson was secretary of the American Psychological Association for six years. He was the primary doctoral advisor to 88 doctoral students during his time at the University of Minnesota.
