= Society for Personality Assessment =

Organization

Society for Personality Assessment (SPA) is the largest psychological society focused on personality assessment. It was founded in 1937 by Bruno Klopfer as the Rorschach Institute, renamed as The Society for Projective Tests and the Rorschach Institute in 1948, shortened to The Society for Projective Techniques in 1960, and given its current name in 1971.

It publishes the Journal of Personality Assessment and manages several awards, including the Bruno Klopfer Award.

== History ==
The Rorschach Institute arose casually in either 1936 or 1937 as a term for the group surrounding the popular workshops and meetings at Columbia University held by Bruno Klopfer about the Rorschach test. In May 1938 the group was incorporated over concerns that others might take the name. The bylaws were formalized in March 1939 and the first officers were: Bruno Klopfer, director, Morris Krugman, president, Douglas M. Kelley, vice-president, Ruth Wolfson, secretary, and Gladys Tallman, treasurer.
