= The Center Cannot Hold (book) =

2007 book by Elyn Saks

The Center Cannot Hold: My Journey Through Madness
- Author: Elyn Saks
- Language: English
- Publisher: Hyperion Books (first edition); Grand Central Publishing (later editions)
- Publication date: August 14, 2007
- Pages: 352
- ISBN: 978-1-4013-0138-5

The Center Cannot Hold: My Journey Through Madness is a 2007 memoir by USC Gould School of Law professor Elyn Saks. Originally published by Hyperion Books, the book recounts Saks's experiences with schizophrenia, beginning in childhood and continuing through her academic and professional career.

While attending Oxford University on a Marshall Scholarship, Saks was admitted to Warneford Hospital, where she burnt herself and wandered underground tunnels. After graduating from Oxford in 1981, she attended Yale Law School and was hospitalized at Yale New Haven Hospital (YNHH) after a psychotic break, where she was later restrained on and off for three weeks. Saks accepted a position at USC following her graduation from Yale, married, and summarized that "[w]hile medication had kept me alive, it had been psychoanalysis that had helped me find a life worth living".

The Center Cannot Hold was reviewed positively in a number of publications, with reviewers emphasizing the importance of psychoanalysis in Saks's journey, though some found the book slow-paced. After publication, Jerry Weintraub optioned the book and Saks won a 2009 MacArthur Fellows Program grant for US$500,000.

== Author and background ==
At the time of publication, the author Elyn R. Saks was an endowed professor at the USC Gould School of Law and an adjunct psychiatry professor at the University of California San Diego School of Medicine. Saks graduated as valedictorian from Vanderbilt University in June 1977, where she studied philosophy. After graduation, she earned a Marshall Scholarship and graduated from Oxford University in 1981 with a Master of Letters in philosophy. Saks has a Juris Doctor from Yale Law School (1986) and a Doctor of Philosophy from the New Center for Psychoanalysis.

The book's title originated from a line in "The Second Coming", a 1919 poem by W. B. Yeats. According to Rosalind Austin in the journal Mental Health and Social Inclusion, the title conveys "the extent to which her illness fractures her reality" and invokes "the literary context of an apocalyptic world, where 'the falcon cannot hear the falconer, Things fall apart'." Hyperion Books published the first edition of The Center Cannot Hold in 2007; subsequent editions have been published by Grand Central Publishing.

== Synopsis ==
The Center Cannot Hold details episodes of psychosis, hospitalizations, and Saks's evolving relationship with treatment, including antipsychotic medication and psychoanalysis. The memoir begins with a prologue which describes Saks at the Yale Law Library, where she climbs through a window onto the roof and scares her classmates with her nonsensical utterances. The next day she is taken to the Yale New Haven Hospital (YNHH) emergency room, where doctors restrain her to a metal bed.

At seven or eight, Saks experiences a loss in her sense of self in which her awareness grows unclear and she feels like "a sand castle with all the sand sliding away in the receding surf", though she says the experience is difficult to describe. Walking home during the day from high school, Saks believes houses are sending her messages. After high school, she attends Vanderbilt University, where she begins to neglect her hygiene.

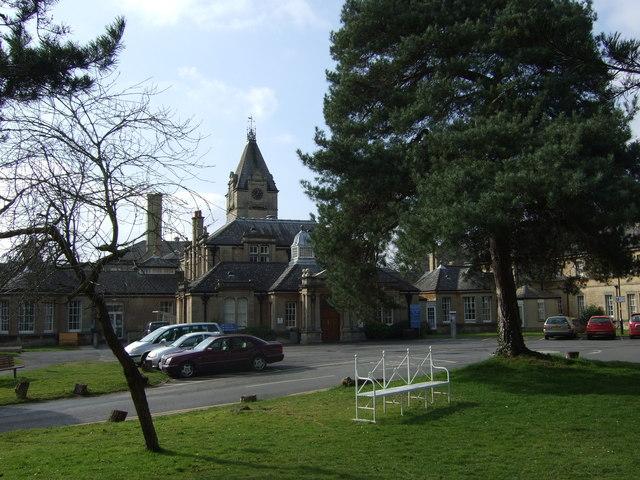
Warneford Hospital, to which Saks was admitted twice, pictured in 2009

Saks recounts one experience of swallowing a full bottle of aspirin pills, making herself vomit, and being taken to Vanderbilt Hospital. She graduates from Vanderbilt and attends Oxford, where she isolates and talks and gestures to herself. At the advice of a friend's neurologist husband, she sees a general practitioner, to whom Saks shows a burn mark she intentionally inflicted and states how she would commit suicide if given the chance. She is eventually admitted to the Warneford Hospital in Oxford, where she begins taking amitriptyline for depression.

Re-admitted at Warneford, Saks walks the tunnels underneath the hospital and burns herself. She begins Kleinian analysis with a psychoanalyst, Mrs. Jones, is discharged from Warneford, and completes her graduate degree at Oxford. Saks applies to law school and Yale accepts her, though she is no longer on any medication or in therapy by the time she reaches the campus. A professor brings Saks to the YNHH emergency room after a psychotic break, where she is put in mechanical restraints.

Released to the YNHH's Psychiatric Evaluation Unit, Memorial Unit 10 (MU10), after a stay at the Yale Psychiatric Institute (YPI), Saks is restrained on and off for the next three weeks. MU10 calls the law school and informs the dean she cannot return "that year, or possibly ever", effectively withdrawing from the school. A doctor diagnoses her with paranoid schizophrenia. She returns to YPI, but transfers to Institute of the Pennsylvania Hospital on the advice of a therapist; after three months, she is discharged and returns to her family, again off her antipsychotic medications.

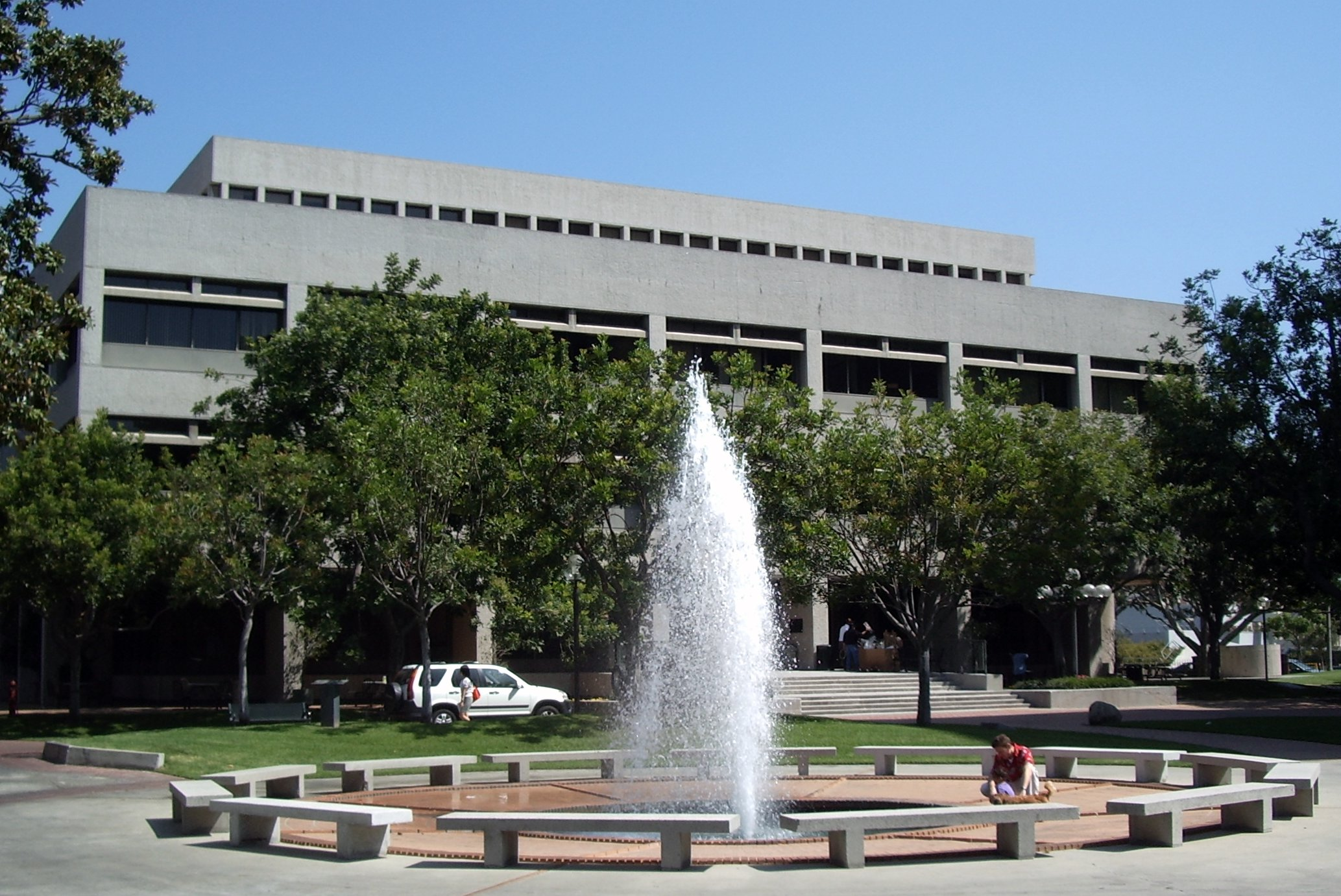
The USC Gould School of Law, where Saks received a tenured professorship, photographed in 2006

Re-admitted to Yale, Saks re-enters psychoanalysis with psychiatrist Dr. Joseph White, who prescribes her Navane. She befriends Stephen H. Behnke, and variously goes off and comes back on medication. Saks graduates from Yale Law School and scores in the 99th percentile on her bar exam. She eventually accepts a position at USC Gould School of Law, which turns into a tenured professorship, though again she struggles to stay on her medications with her new psychiatrist, Dr. Kaplan.

She meets Will, a librarian at USC, and asks him to lunch; he accepts. Saks summarizes that "[w]hile medication had kept me alive, it had been psychoanalysis that had helped me find a life worth living". She tells Will about her schizophrenia, and he accepts her. Saks defeats breast cancer, and marries Will. She believes Stephen and Dr. Kaplan are replaced by identical imposters, an example of Capgras syndrome. Kaplan threatens to tell the Los Angeles Psychoanalytic Society and Institute, where she attends, that she is not in analysis anymore, although she is, which she interprets as his attempt to punish her; she retains a new psychiatrist, Dr. Freed. The book concludes that "[m]y good fortune is not that I've recovered from mental illness. [...] My good fortune lies in having found my life".

== Reception ==
The Center Cannot Hold was reviewed positively in a number of publications, with reviewers emphasizing the importance of psychoanalysis in Saks's journey. In a review for The American Journal of Psychiatry, Justin Simon called The Center Cannot Hold a complex insider perspective of schizophrenia, with psychoanalysis a curing force for her substantial mental illness; other factors that led to her success, according to Simon, included an intact family that could afford treatment, and Saks's ability to form friendships. J. Simon noted that the "most predictable disorganizing influence is change" in her life. Similarly, Dale L. Johnson, professor emeritus in the department of psychology at the University of Houston, wrote in Psychiatric Rehabilitation Journal that Saks's relationship with Will helped her in coping with her illness. Overall, Nirbhay N. Singh of the Journal of Child and Family Studies said Saks utilized her brain to heal her brain.

Saks's relationship with medication was also highlighted by reviewers as important. In the San Francisco Chronicle, Clea Simon stated how the importance of treatment allowed Saks to write the book, calling it a historical original and noting how treatment allowed Ken Steele to write his 2001 memoir The Day the Voices Stopped about his psychosis as well. C. Simon describes the book as fluent but at times deeply disturbing. A reviewer for Publishers Weekly agreed, detailing that the book was weighty reading and calling Saks's constant desire to cease medication a motif.

In The Psychoanalytic Review, psychoanalyst Susan Flynn noted "[w]hile each analysis is complete unto itself, it lives in relation and gathers meaning from its proximity to the others". She described the book as a "love song to psychoanalysis" and "required reading for clinical training programs". Though Johnson states "research has shown that psychoanalysis does not help people with schizophrenia", and due to this it "has been virtually abandoned as a treatment modality for this group of patients", he states psychoanalysis seems to have helped Saks. Johnson further states Saks's vivid descriptions of her psychotic ramblings reminded him of the descriptions of psychosis in Mark Vonnegut's The Eden Express.

Francis Anthony O'Neill of the Ulster Medical Journal described the memoir as a "very clear and unsentimental account" of living with schizophrenia and praised it as "remarkable, bold and clearly written". He noted its value as a first-hand perspective on psychosis and highlighted Saks's critique of physical restraints in psychiatric care. O'Neill emphasized that the book avoids the excesses of so-called "misery lit", calling it "particularly thought provoking for those of us at the 'other side' of the experience". Jonathan Britmann, head of the Institute of Clinical Psychology and Psychotherapy in Pruszków, Poland, wrote in Psychosis that "[t]his is a live testimony confirming what many people want to deny: it confirms that a human being suffering from schizophrenia has the same needs as all of us who consider ourselves as normal".

Some reviewers found the book slow-paced. An overview in Kirkus Reviews stated "she spends more time on the history of institutionalization and treatment than she does on the emotional and psychological details that would rescue her account from tedium", and called the book "often a snooze". Similarly, Flynn described the book as "slow—at times excruciating, but always truthful".

== Post publication ==
The Center Cannot Hold won a "Books for a Better Life" Inspirational Memoir Award, presented by the National Multiple Sclerosis Society. Benedict Carey of The New York Times described the book as "an overnight sensation in mental health circles"; after publication, Saks went on a speaking tour and Jerry Weintraub optioned The Center Cannot Hold, a process that "rents" the rights to a source material to a potential film producer. Saks opened two research studies following the book's publication, and subsequently won a 2009 MacArthur Fellows Program "genius grant" for US$500,000.

== See also ==
- List of memoirs about schizophrenia
