= Ellen Meara =

American health economist

Academic background
- Education: Harvard University; Northwestern University

Academic work
- Discipline: Health economics
- Institutions: The Dartmouth Institute for Health Policy and Clinical Practice; National Bureau of Economic Research; Dartmouth College
- Website: tdi.dartmouth.edu/faculty/ellen-meara-phd

Ellen Rose Meara is a professor at The Dartmouth Institute for Health Policy and Clinical Practice, part of Dartmouth College in New Hampshire, United States. Her research is in the fields of health economics and health policy. She is also a faculty research fellow at the National Bureau of Economic Research and an adjunct professor in economics at Dartmouth College.

== Education ==
Meara graduated from Northwestern University in 1991, with a B.A. in Mathematical Methods for Social Sciences and Political Science and from Harvard University in 1999 with a Ph.D. in Economics.

== Career and research ==
Meara was previously as an associate professor of Health Care Policy at Harvard Medical School. Her research has been published in the American Journal of Psychiatry, Health Affairs, JAMA, JAMA Psychiatry, The Journal of Human Resources, Medical Care, the Psychiatric Rehabilitation Journal and Psychiatric Services. She is an editor of the Journal of Health Economics. Her research and focuses on how factors such as education, health insurance coverage, Medicare and Medicaid payment policy, and state and federal regulations are involved in shaping people's health, health care use and economic outcomes.

=== Life expectancy ===
In 2008, Meara led a study which found that life expectancy was increasing in the United States, but only among those who had received 12 or more years of education. Commenting on the study, Meara said "The puzzle is why we have been successful in extending life span for some groups" but not for others, and concluded that "We need to get a better understanding of how we can extend these great things we're learning about how to lead healthier lives into these groups". In a 2015, commentary on research by Angus Deaton and Anne Case on rising death rates among middle-aged white Americans, Meara and Jonathan S. Skinner explored possible explanations including racial differences in opioid prescriptions and financial pessimism. Meara appeared alongside Case on The Diane Rehm Show to discuss their findings.

=== Opioid use ===
A 2014, study which Meara helped to lead found that roughly 4 million disabled Americans were prescribed painkillers including codeine, morphine, OxyContin and vicodin, and that one fifth of those prescriptions were for doses high enough to risk serious side effects or overdose. A 2016 study led by Meara found that laws restricting the prescription, dispensation and receipt of opioids had no discernible effect on disabled Medicare recipients and had not reduced the frequency of overdoses.
