= Doctoring the Mind =

2009 book by Richard Bentall

Doctoring the Mind: Why psychiatric treatments fail
- Author: Richard Bentall
- Language: English
- Subject: Psychiatry
- Publisher: Allen Lane
- Publication date: 2009
- Publication place: United Kingdom
- Media type: Print (Hardcover and Paperback)
- Pages: 304
- ISBN: 9780713998894
- OCLC: 317748917
- Dewey Decimal: 616.891
- LC Class: RC454 .B452 2009

Doctoring the Mind: Why psychiatric treatments fail is a 2009 book by Richard Bentall, his thesis is critical of contemporary Western psychiatry. Bentall, a professor of clinical psychology, argues that recent scientific research shows that the medical approach to mental illness is fatally flawed. According to Bentall, it seems there is no "evidence that psychiatry has made a positive impact on human welfare" and "patients are doing no better today than they did a hundred years ago".

The book focuses on psychotic disorders, especially those diagnosed as schizophrenia and bipolar disorder.

== Background ==
Richard Bentall, a professor of clinical psychology, has edited and written several books, most notably Madness Explained. A review by Paul Broks in The Sunday Times summarized its position as: "Like Szasz, Bentall is firmly opposed to the biomedical model, but he also takes issue with extreme social relativists who would deny the reality of madness." In the book, Bentall also argues that no clear distinction exists between those diagnosed with mental illnesses and the "well". While this notion is more widely accepted in psychiatry when it comes to anxiety and depression, Bentall insists that schizotypal experiences are also common. Bentall has also been significantly influenced by the writings of R.D. Laing.

According to reviewer Carolyn Quadrio, Doctoring The Mind: Is Our Current Treatment Of Mental Illness Really Any Good? is an easy to read "shorter and more accessible version" of Madness Explained. A review of this book by neuro-scientist Roy Sugarman found that it allied itself with the anti-psychiatry movement in its critiques of biological psychiatry. The review in PsycCRITIQUES was more nuanced, pointing out that Bentall did not reject psycho-pharmacology, but that he was concerned over its overuse.

== Synopsis ==
In the preface, Bentall writes that "conventional psychiatry might reasonably be criticized, not on hard-to-define humanistic grounds (although these are important) but because it has been profoundly unscientific and at the same time unsuccessful at helping some of the most distressed and vulnerable people in our society".

The book features a short history of psychiatry, also covering anti-psychiatry and clinical psychology.

Bentall argues that the psychiatric diagnoses of schizophrenia and bipolar disorder are not meaningful classifications. As an alternative to neo-Kraepelinian classification systems such as DSM and ICD-10 Chapter V employing these diagnostic labels, Bentall proposes to focus on symptoms ("complaints"), such as paranoia or auditory hallucinations.

He also argues that psychiatric researchers have overestimated the extent to which serious mental illness is genetically inherited while underestimating environmental influences. According to Bentall, psychiatric diseases are not isolated diseases of the brain, but occur in a social context. He presents theoretical models for paranoia and auditory hallucinations involving psychological and biological mechanisms.

According to Bentall, the pharmaceutical industry, as a profit-oriented industry, has been successful in exaggerating the potency of some psychotropic drugs through "ruthless manipulation of the clinical trial data" (he mentions SSRIs as an example). Bentall states that the pharmaceutical industry also increases sales through sponsoring and bonus payments. The author discerns that antipsychotics (psychotropic drugs used primarily in the treatment of psychotic disorders) can be effective, but are frequently misused, despite their heavy side-effects. According to Bentall:

- Psychiatrists often treat patients who fail to respond to one antipsychotic with a series of other antipsychotics, although it is unlikely that they will respond.
- Over-prescription, which only increases the risk of side effects, is common.
- Some groups of patients may do better with no or only short-period antipsychotic treatment.

Bentall claims that "despite [...] serious limitations [antipsychotics'] use has become almost synonymous with psychiatric treatment" and that "weaning services from this dangerous addiction will necessitate completely rethinking the values and goals of psychiatric care".

According to Bentall, psychotherapy, as currently practiced, can already achieve modest effects in treating people with psychosis. He supposes that not all patients will benefit from psychotherapy. With regard to psychotherapy, the book focuses on cognitive-behavioral therapy, but Bentall leaves room for the Dodo bird conjecture.

More generally, Bentall sees the therapeutic relationship at the center of clinical practice. He argues that psychiatric professionals have been blind "to the fact that distress in human beings is usually caused by unsatisfactory relationships with other human beings" and that they have ignored that "warmth and kindness are necessary to promote psychological healing".

Bentall claims that "coercion [of patients] has been become so universally accepted amongst mental health professionals that many no longer see it as ethically troubling". But, according to Bentall, coercion should be avoided for multiple "utilitarian and practical" reasons. Bentall compares a "paternalistic-medical" and an "autonomy-promoting" vision of future psychiatric care. While the former has the treatment goals of "management of mental illness by symptom reduction", the latter pursues a recovery approach, where the treatment goals are "whatever the patient thinks is most important, but especially improvement in self-esteem, self-efficacy, relationships with others and quality of life". The latter approach also refutes a claim to leadership by doctors. This vision also entails relinquishing authority to patients, especially through consumer movements. Bentall claims that "the engagement of patients in the design and development of services [...] is most likely to lead to lasting improvements".

== Awards and nominations ==
- Nominated for Mind Book of the Year 2010

== Reviews ==
The book was reviewed in scientific journals including Psychiatric Services, Psychological Medicine, New Scientist, Psychosis, Journal of Mental Health, Disability & Society, Acta Medica Academica, PsycCRITIQUES, Cognitive Neuropsychiatry, Journal of the History of the Behavioral Sciences, The Psychologist, Metascience.

The book was also reviewed in such newspapers as The Observer, The Guardian, The Daily Telegraph, Scientific American Mind.

== Author ==
Born in Sheffield, Bentall attended the University College of North Wales, Bangor as an undergraduate before registering for a Ph.D. in Experimental Psychology at the same institution. After being awarded his doctorate, he moved to the University of Liverpool to undertake professional training as a Clinical Psychologist. He later returned to his alma mater of Liverpool to work as a lecturer, after a brief stint working for the National Health Service as a Forensic Clinical Psychologist. In later years, he studied an MA in Philosophy Applied to Healthcare from University of Wales, Swansea. He was eventually promoted to Professor of Clinical Psychology at University of Liverpool. In 1999, he accepted a position at the University of Manchester, collaborating with the numerous researchers working in understanding the psychology and treatment of psychotic experiences. Bentall is currently a professor of clinical psychology at Bangor University, in Wales.

== See also ==
- Anti-psychiatry
- John Read (psychologist)
