= Operators and Things =

1958 anonymous book about schizophrenia

Operators and Things: The Inner Life of a Schizophrenic
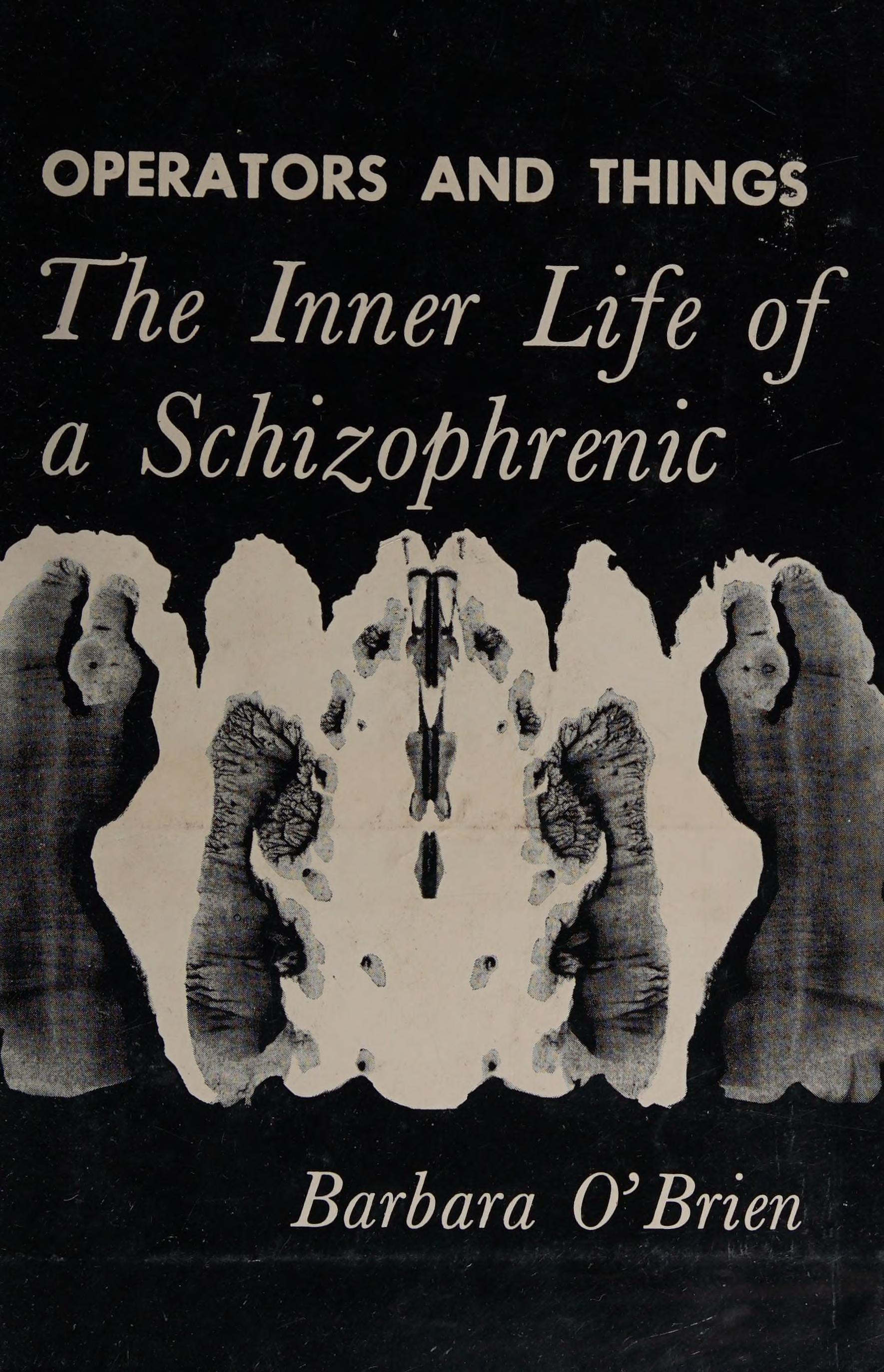
- First edition cover
- Author: Anonymous; published under the pen name Barbara O'Brien
- Language: English
- Genre: Autobiography
- Publisher: Arlington Books
- Publication date: 1958
- Publication place: Cambridge, Massachusetts
- Pages: 166 pp. (first edition)
- ISBN: 978-0-615-50928-0
- OCLC: 1336334671
- Dewey Decimal: 616.8
- LC Class: 58-8397

Operators and Things: The Inner Life of a Schizophrenic is a 1958 autobiographical account of a woman's experience with the onset and recovery from schizophrenia, published anonymously under the pen name Barbara O'Brien.

Published by Arlington Books, the book follows the author as she wakes up to see three gray and wispy figures in front of her bed, whom she calls "operators", the same name as she gives to those in her professional life who manipulate others for their own gain. The figures take her on a journey across the United States, where she eventually sees a psychoanalyst. The book was reviewed in a number of publications, with Robert Kirsch describing it as "a work of brilliance and power, evoking a combination of Kafka and Joyce, with a touch of Orwell".

== Author and background ==
Operators and Things was authored by an anonymous woman writing under the pen name "Barbara O'Brien". Arlington Books, a publisher based out of Cambridge, Massachusetts, United States, printed the book in 1958, their first book published. Originally slated to be published by Beacon Press, it was one of several books that Beacon editor Tom Bledsoe brought to his newly founded Arlington Books. The first edition contained an introduction by Michael Maccoby and a perfunctory note by L. J. Reyna. Subsequent editions were published in 1975 by A. S. Barnes, 1976 by Signet, and in 2011 by Silver Birch Press. According to the 2011 version, the last time anyone had heard from O'Brien was in 1976, when she wrote an additional chapter for a new version of the book. Her author's blurb for the 1976 publication stated she was "fully recovered" and living outside of Los Angeles, but did not reveal her real identity.

== Plot summary ==
The book is an autobiographical account of an anonymous woman's onset with and recovery from schizophrenia. One morning, O'Brien awakens to find three gray, wispy figures standing at her bedside. She terms these figures the "operators", who take her throughout the United States and eventually to a psychoanalyst. In her job in business, O'Brien defines "operators" as those who manipulate others for success or achievement. The "things", on the other hand, are defined as those who cannot "operate", who work on "trust and candor", according to Robert Kirsch of the Los Angeles Times. The wispy figure "operators" last for approximately six months and then disappear. The second half of the book deals with her "amateurish theorizing" (according to a writer for The Daily Item [TDI]) on the nature of her illness.

== Reception ==
The book was reviewed in a number of publications. Kirsch called the book "a work of brilliance and power, evoking a combination of Kafka and Joyce, with a touch of Orwell". A writer for The Daily Item called Operators and Things "fascinating reading". In The Sacramento Bee, a reviewer said O'Brien's work may have been better off in a magazine, which the reviewer attributed to her slick style and her "unsettling habit of downgrading practically every psychoanalytic and psychiatric study method". The Lincoln Journal Star described the book as striking and strange, and called O'Brien intelligent, while a review in the Nashville Banner said the book was not another Three Faces of Eve. The Banner went on to say that it would interest the layman while impressing the professional due to O'Brien's thorough examination of the unconscious self. Publishers Weekly summarized the book as "an absorbing account of life in the dream world of a schizophrenic". Leicester Cotton of The Sydney Morning Herald called the author's fugue terrifying. The book was also reviewed in CoEvolution Quarterly. Mark Bould suggests the book is actually a "satire on corporations, patriarchy and alienation, published as a schizophrenic's autobiography."

In Journal of Personality Assessment, Zygmunt A. Piotrowski observed O'Brien's personality change as from ambitious to less so post psychosis, with the change described as desirable so as to lessen her stress and so as to not threaten her sense of reality. The book is analyzed in an article titled "Misattribution of agency in schizophrenia: An exploration of historical first-person accounts" in the journal of Phenomenology and the Cognitive Sciences by J. P. M. A Maes and A. R. Van Gool. The book was also reviewed by Samuel J. Beck in the Archives of General Psychiatry, and Richard Lazarus in Contemporary Psychology.

== See also ==
- List of memoirs about schizophrenia
- The Eden Express – 1975 book by Mark Vonnegut
- Mary Barnes – English artist and writer (1923–2001)
