= My Schizophrenic Life =

2010 book by Sandra Yuen MacKay

My Schizophrenic Life: The Road to Recovery from Mental Illness
- Author: Sandra Yuen MacKay
- Language: English
- Publisher: Bridgeross Communications
- Publication date: September 2010
- Pages: 210
- ISBN: 978-0-9810037-9-5
- OCLC: 659174174

My Schizophrenic Life: The Road to Recovery from Mental Illness is a 2010 memoir by Canadian artist Sandra Yuen MacKay. Published by Bridgeross Communications, the book is a first-person retelling of MacKay's life, especially after her early diagnosis with paranoid schizophrenia. Later diagnosed with schizoaffective disorder, MacKay recounts her childhood, going to university, occupational history, marriage, her art, and hallucinations and hospitalizations as a result of her mental illness. The book concludes with the author recognizing that her illness is not a "life sentence".

My Schizophrenic Life received plaudits from reviewers for encouraging hope for recovery among the mentally ill, though one reviewer called the book's writing style disjointed. After the book's publication, MacKay won the 2012 Courage to Come Back award from the non-profit agency Coast Mental Health.

== Author and background ==
The author of the book is Sandra Yuen MacKay, a Vancouver, British Columbia, Canada-based artist and writer. She graduated from Langara College with a diploma in Fine Arts, later completing a Bachelor of Arts in art history from the University of British Columbia. Her writings have been published in The Prairie Journal, The Bulletin, and Front Magazine. MacKay wrote a draft of the book in six months; certain excerpts included in the book were previously published in The Bulletin. These excerpts were slightly edited for the book.

Bridgeross Communications published My Schizophrenic Life in 2010.

== Synopsis ==
The book recounts MacKay's childhood, going to university, her occupational history, marriage, art, and her hallucinations and hospitalizations as a result of mental illness. Growing up in Vancouver, MacKay has a normal childhood, but increasingly felt inadequate and shy in high school. She experiences apathy and a poor ability to engage socially, but states that those could have been attributed to average teenage behavior.

Olfactory, auditory, and visual hallucinations start in grade nine for MacKay, as she states she develops a relationship with the imagined voice of a popular classmate. Her hygiene deteriorates as she believes she is spied on in the shower. She wears the same clothes every day, and thinks about poisoning her family's food with cleaning powder. After she vandalizes her home and refuses to take medication, she is taken to a hospital's psychiatric ward, where she receives a Haldol injection and a paranoid schizophrenia diagnosis.

Now in a different psychiatric ward, MacKay is sexually assaulted by another patient, but is released under a psychiatrist. An acquaintance, Greg, asks MacKay on a date and she accepts. She graduates from high school, and attends and graduates from community college with a Fine Arts diploma. Immediately afterwards, she enrolls at a university on a government scholarship for art history She notes that her ability to concentrate is impeded by her medications and "mania, depression [and] delusions". She graduates university, though she took longer than other students.

She begins work at her father's architectural firm. She marries Greg, and switches from seeing an individual psychiatrist to seeing a mental health team, composed of a psychiatrist, case managers, nurses, and support staff in addition to others. She is readmitted to a psychiatric ward around spring 1998, but discharges two weeks later. A psychiatrist diagnoses MacKay with schizoaffective disorder, a combination of schizophrenia and a mood disorder. She studies acrylic painting at a local art studio, focusing on texture, perspective, light, and shadow: a painting of an iris she drew is sold and given to Vancouver Coastal Health's chief executive officer.

MacKay starts to give public speeches; in one, a speaker before her went over the causes of schizophrenia. She notes how she has several friends, a contrast to years ago when she had none. On facing stigma, MacKay suggests either ignoring it or confronting it assertively. In the final chapter "[r]eflections", MacKay states the importance of hope for those with mental illnesses, and stresses the importance of insight to her mental wellness. The book concludes with the author recognizing that her illness is not a "life sentence".

== Reception ==
My Schizophrenic Life was reviewed positively in a number of publications. In Psychiatric Services, psychiatry professor Kathleen Crapanzano stated that additionally to the author's descriptions of psychosis, her final reflections were what made the book "particularly remarkable" and called MacKay's writing straightforward but removed of her private thoughts. She stated that those who sought hope in recovery would benefit from the book. Similarly, in a review for The Canadian Journal of Occupational Therapy, Paulette Guitard stated that My Schizophrenic Life conveyed hope for recovery. In Library Journal, Lynne F. Maxwell of the Villanova University School of Law library called the book incredibly compelling though disjointed and in need of an editor. The book also received a review in the Canadian magazine Geist by Patty Osborne.

== Post publication ==
After the book's publication, MacKay won the 2012 Courage to Come Back award from the non-profit agency Coast Mental Health. The award "honour[s] British Columbians who have overcome incredible physical, mental and social adversity to rebuild their lives and give back to others". In 2013, she was awarded the Queen Elizabeth II Diamond Jubilee Medal for her community contributions.

== See also ==
- List of memoirs about schizophrenia
