= List of memoirs about schizophrenia =

Schizophrenia is a mental disorder characterized variously by hallucinations (typically, hearing voices), delusions, disorganized thinking and behavior, and flat or inappropriate affect. Various authors with the condition have written memoirs, which have been analyzed in a variety of literature.

== Memoirs ==
Various authors have written memoirs on experiences with schizophrenia

Title	Author	Identifier	Reference
Does God exist? Diary of schizophrenic	Sara Tomczak	ISBN 978-1-0369-3128-5	Amazon
The Center Cannot Hold	Elyn Saks	ISBN 978-1-4013-0138-5	
The Cliffs of Schizophrenia	Jake McCook; Laurette McCook	ISBN 979-8-350-92596-8	
The Day the Voices Stopped	Ken Steele	ISBN 978-0-465-08226-1	
Divided Minds: Twin Sisters and Their Journey Through Schizophrenia	Pamela Spiro Wagner; Carolyn S. Spiro	ISBN 978-0-312-32064-5	
Me, Myself, and Them	Kurt Snyder	ISBN 978-0-19-531122-8	
My Schizophrenic Life	Sandra Yuen MacKay	ISBN 978-0-9810037-9-5	
Operators and Things	Barbara O'Brien	OCLC 1336334671	
Overcoming OCD and Schizophrenia With God in My Life	Chip F. Correll	ISBN 978-0-595-12147-2	
Recovered, Not Cured	Richard McLean	ISBN 978-1-74115-134-3	
A Road Back from Schizophrenia: A Memoir	Arnhild Lauveng	ISBN 978-1-61608-871-2	
Swallow the Ocean: A Memoir	Laura M. Flynn	ISBN 978-1-58243-461-2	
