= The Day the Voices Stopped =

2001 book by Ken Steele and Claire Berman

The Day the Voices Stopped: A Schizophrenic's Journey from Madness to Hope
- Hardcover edition
- Author: Ken Steele; Claire Berman
- Language: English
- Publisher: Basic Books
- Publication date: April 17, 2001 (hardcover); May 9, 2002 (paperback revised edition)
- Pages: 272
- ISBN: 978-0-465-08226-1

The Day the Voices Stopped: A Schizophrenic's Journey from Madness to Hope is a 2001 posthumous memoir by Ken Steele and Claire Berman about Steele's life with schizophrenia and his recovery after the invention of risperidone, an atypical antipsychotic. Published by Basic Books, The Day the Voices Stopped follows Steele as he moves from his hometown to New York City and eventually becomes a gay prostitute. After cycling in and out of homelessness, psychiatric hospitals, halfway houses, jobs, alcohol use, and suicide attempts across the United States, all the while with inner voices hectoring him, Steele eventually recovers to quiet the voices and form a get out the vote organization and a newspaper in NYC.

Reviewers noted how the book provided an insider's account of the disease, including accounts of psychiatric hospitals from a consumer perspective, and found his eventual recovery a complement to the book's earlier grim tone. Publishers Weekly stated many readers will feel drained by the time he becomes a spokesman for the mentally ill, while the Journal of Undergraduate Neuroscience Education listed the book as one of six autobiographies to engage students of neuroscience, psychology, and general education for a neurobiology of disease course. A revised edition (paperback) was published in 2002.

== Publication ==
Ken Steele's memoir is co-written with Claire Berman, a freelance writer who had published several books about family relations. Steele died in October 2000 from heart disease in Manhattan after completing most of the manuscript, though he had not yet finished writing his "Acknowledgements" section. Basic Books published the hardcover first edition of The Day the Voices Stopped in 2001. A revised edition was published in paperback in 2002.

== Synopsis ==
Note: synopsis based on non-revised edition

The book is a memoir of Steele's life with schizophrenia, including his early life, hospitalizations, stints in homelessness and halfway houses, suicide attempts, his times as a gay prostitute, and his eventual recovery with the help of risperidone, an atypical antipsychotic. The Day the Voices Stopped begins with a foreword by Stephen Goldfinger, a psychiatrist who met Steele in San Francisco in 1981 when Steele lived in an alleyway, and a prologue, in which Steele wins the 1999 Clifford W. Beers Award from the National Mental Health Association. Steele starts to hear internal voices in October 1962, when he was fourteen years old; they instruct him to kill himself. Several months later, Steele unsuccessfully attempts to die by suicide three times in one night. He meets with his family physician, who diagnoses him with schizophrenia. Steele drops out of high school after he fails courses and skips classes.

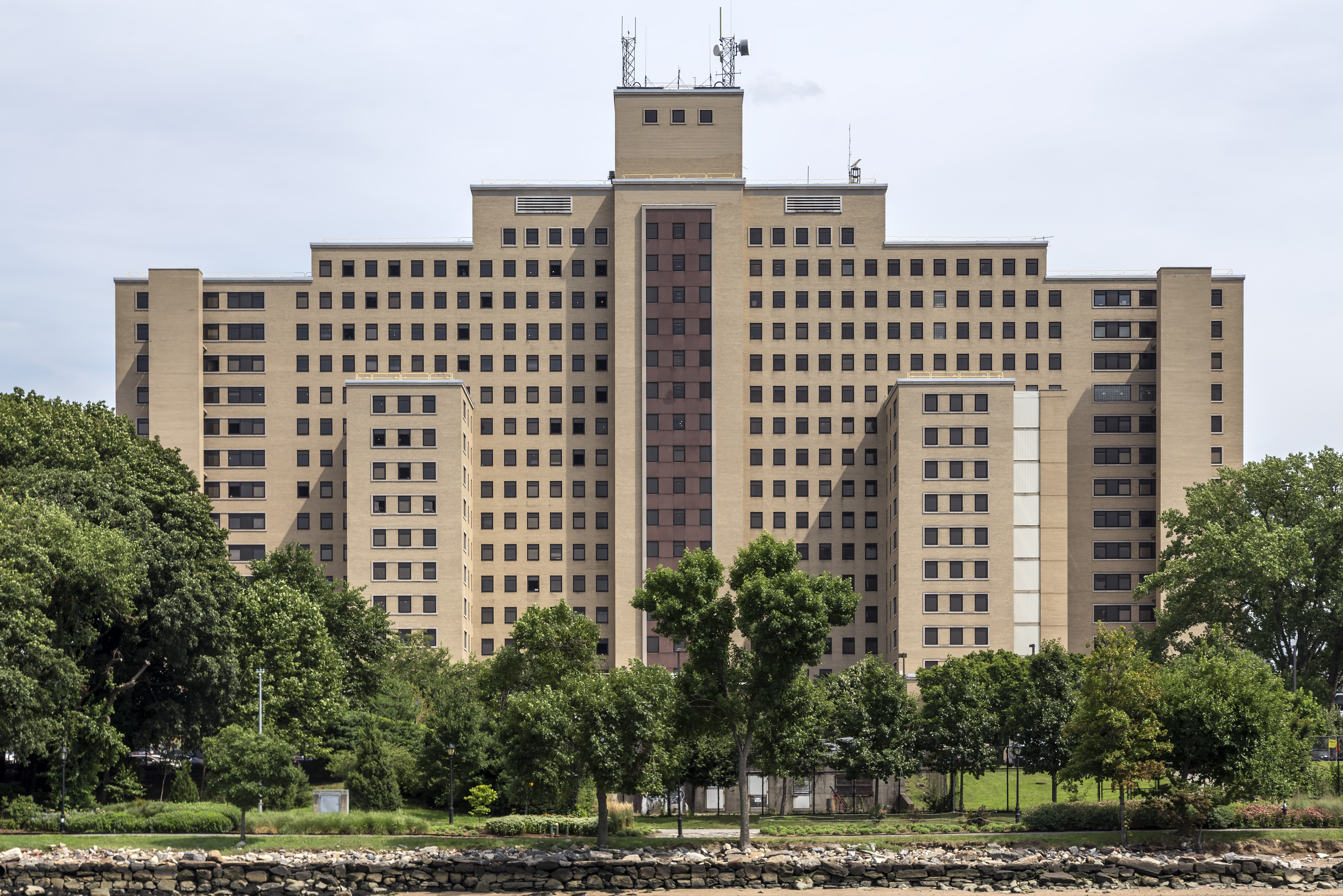
Manhattan Psychiatric Center (pictured), where Steele was hospitalized

He moves to NYC and becomes a gay prostitute for Ted, a man in his early thirties Steele met at Grand Central Station, and Ted's associate, Nick. Steele is hospitalized at Manhattan State Hospital after climbing a building to jump off of it. He escapes Manhattan State and transfers to Harlem Valley State Hospital, where several men gang rape him in a seclusion room, then returns to Manhattan State.

He cycles between hospitals and homelessness: from Harlem Valley to Manhattan State, to homeless, to Metropolitan State Hospital in Waltham, Massachusetts, to homeless, to Westborough State Hospital. At Westborough, he describes himself as "K. Shannon Steele", a name that would he would use officially from then on. He gains a job and home at a halfway house, but leaves after eight months when a new admission attacks a pregnant nurse he liked, leaving her in critical condition and her baby killed.

Steele meets Karl, a man in his early thirties, at a gay nightclub (the Napoleon Club) in Chicago. Karl leaves him in Denver and kills himself. Steele leaves his therapist and halfway house at Fort Logan Mental Health Center due to the voices. From Pueblo State Hospital, Steele returns home to his parents and younger brother, and attempts suicide. He blacks out and police arrest him for lewd acts, resisting arrest, disorderly conduct, and breaking the peace; his father bails him out of jail. In Hartford, Connecticut, Steele is committed at Norwich State Hospital, where he remains for two years.

Steele takes a bus to San Francisco, where he intends to jump off of the Golden Gate Bridge. He checks in to Pacific Presbyterian Medical Center after telling a workmate in San Francisco about his plan to kill himself; upon discharge, Steele volunteers for Dianne Feinstein, who is running for mayor of the city. He joins the Citywide Alcoholism Advisory Board (CAAB) from Alcoholics Anonymous, though he resigns from CAAB due to paranoia that others will discover his lies about his background (Steele claimed he had business degrees from Harvard University). He quits his job, and in 1981 meets the psychiatrist Stephen Goldfinger, who remains in touch with him.

He is admitted to San Francisco General Hospital. They release him to a day program, from which he elopes and cycles through Loma Linda Medical Center, to a halfway house, to another hospital, which manumits him after his Medi-Cal coverage ends. He flies to Hawaii; there, after another hospitalization and halfway house, Hawaii governor George Ariyoshi appoints him as the first consumer on the State Council on Mental Health. His fear of others discovering his lies leads him to return to NYC, where he climbs a tall building and attempts to jump off. He is committed to Manhattan State (now Manhattan Psychiatric Center).

Steele applies for Supplemental Security Income to "financially support the move to housing". He moves on to a community rehabilitation program and progresses to an apartment (living with a workmate) in Park Slope, Brooklyn, later beginning therapy with Dr. Rita Seiden. In August 1994, a doctor prescribes risperidone for Steele: the voices stop for him on May 3, 1995. He begins a voter registration project for the mentally ill, the Mental Health Voter Empowerment Project, which operated in thirty-six states as of the book's publication. Steele takes over a newsletter at the mental health center to which he goes and renames it New York City Voices: A Consumer Journal for Mental Health; at the time of the book's publication, it had a circulation of 40,000. The book concludes with an afterword by Steele, with "the good news" sections describing issues such as the Americans with Disabilities Act contrasted with "but" sections describing issues remaining within the community.

== Reception ==
The Day the Voices Stopped was reviewed in a number of publications. In the Psychiatric Rehabilitation Journal, Phyllis Solomon stated the book offered an insider's perspective on schizophrenia, contrasting it with The Outsider by Nathaniel Lachenmeyer. Solomon notes overlaps between the life stories in the books, with both main figures "abandoned by their families, out of ignorance and an inability to cope, with no intended malice; numerous rehospitalizations, periods of homelessness, frequent police encounters, and self-medicating with alcohol". She called Steele's recovery story inspirational. In the journal Beyond Behavior, former Kansas state legislator Tom Thompson called the author's insights as a consumer into psychiatric hospitals very compelling.

Publishers Weekly stated many readers will feel drained by the time he becomes a spokesman for the mentally ill. Similarly, in Psychiatric Services, Jeffrey L. Geller noted that Steele's life was a recurrent cycle with no positive advancement until the end of his life. Kirkus Reviews wrote when the risperidone took his voices away was a "remarkably powerful moment in the story, written with a combination of awe, appreciation, and grace--the perfect antidote to the grim, urgent tone of the earlier pages". Geller, however, questions the emphasis on medication, noting the quality of psychotherapy and psychosocial rehabilitation in Steele's life prior to the medication taking effect as a factor for his late recovery. Writing for Booklist, William Beatty stated "[h]is account of the day the voices stopped will surely remain with everyone who reads it, and the whole book should inform and affect other victims of severe mental illness and their families".

In the Journal of Undergraduate Neuroscience Education, Palissery et al. (2018) list The Day the Voices Stopped as one of six autobiographies to engage students of neuroscience, psychology, and general education for a neurobiology of disease course. The authors called the book "the one [...] that we feel best accomplishes our goals in teaching with memoirs and realistic fiction: helping students see a human side to unfamiliar or misunderstood diseases and motivating them to learn more about the biology of the disorders we teach". The book was also reviewed in the Journal of the American Academy of Child and Adolescent Psychiatry by Theodore A. Petti.

== See also ==
- List of memoirs about schizophrenia
