= Dante's Cure =

2004 book by Daniel Dorman

Dante's Cure: A Journey Out of Madness
- Author: Daniel Dorman
- Language: English
- Publisher: Other Press
- Publication date: April 13, 2004
- Pages: 280
- ISBN: 978-1-59051-101-5
- Website: dantescure.com

Dante's Cure: A Journey Out of Madness is a 2004 nonfiction book by American psychiatrist Daniel Dorman that follows himself and Catherine Penney, a schizophrenic and anorexic woman, as she recovers from both conditions without medication.

At the time of publication, Daniel Dorman worked as an assistant clinical professor of psychiatry at the UCLA School of Medicine, having taught and practiced for more than thirty years. Released by Other Press, the book was praised for the "inspiring" therapeutic relationship between Dorman and Penney, though several reviewers questioned her diagnosis of schizophrenia.

== Author and background ==
At the time of publication, Daniel Dorman worked as an assistant clinical professor of psychiatry at the UCLA School of Medicine, having taught and practiced for more than thirty years. Upon finishing medical school, he interned at District of Columbia General Hospital and took a residency at Albert Einstein College of Medicine. After practicing general medicine, he took a psychiatric residency at UCLA, where he met Catherine Penney; when Dante's Cure was published, she worked as a psychiatric nurse in Southern California.

Other Press released the book in April 2004.

== Synopsis ==
Catherine Penney in 2016

Dante's Cure follows Dorman and Penney, a schizophrenic and anorexic woman, as she recovers from both conditions without medication.

== Reception ==
Kirkus Reviews called the book a "[v]ivid and remarkable account of a psychotic young woman's recovery from schizophrenia, but a persuasive argument for talk therapy requires more than one patient's success story". In Psychiatric Services, Sara Goldman stated upon reading the overview of the story on its flap, she was dubious of its claims. Goldman went on to state she believed Penney might have suffered from psychotic depression instead of schizophrenia, which could account for her recovery without medication with no further relapses. In JAMA, Mary Hartshorn also questions her diagnosis as schizophrenic, as Penney describes the voices as coming from within her head as opposed to thereout, though she said Dorman did an expert job in their therapeutic relationship which allowed her to reach her full potential.

Goldman recommended the psychodynamic discussions in the book for psychiatrists who can overlook Dorman's prejudice against medicine, and praised the last chapter, in which Dorman discusses his personal views on medicine versus psychotherapy, contextualized to questioning the definition of illness and the Diagnostic and Statistical Manual of Mental Disorders system. Publishers Weekly said "[Dorman]'s advocacy of a humanist approach that emphasizes patient-doctor collaboration and the growth of soul will be welcomed by all those who value the psychotherapeutic tradition".

Kirkus questioned the relevancy of Penney's adult romances included in the book. Hartshorn described Dante's Cure as inspirational and stated it presented an example of the best of psychotherapy, while Donna Chavez of Booklist called the result of their relationship nearly fiction in its outcome.
