= Ronald Garet =

American religion law scholar (born 1951)

Ronald Reed Garet (born March 17, 1951, in Los Angeles County, California) is an American religion law scholar, currently the Carolyn Craig Franklin Chair in Law and Religion at USC Gould School of Law.

He graduated from Harvard University, magna cum laude, received his PhD in religious studies from Yale University, and his JD from USC Gould. He is a member of Phi Beta Kappa.
