= Richard McLean =

Richard McLean is the name of:

- Richard McLean (Australia) (born 1973), graphic artist and illustrator for The Age
- Richard McLean (United States) (1934–2014), photo realistic painter
- Ricky McLean (born 1947), Australian rules footballer
