= Stephen H. Behnke =

American psychologist, ethicist, and author

Stephen Houran Behnke (born 1958) is an American psychologist, ethicist, and author. From November 1, 2000, until July 8, 2015, he was the director of the Office of Ethics for the American Psychological Association.

== Career ==
Behnke received his B.A. in classics from Princeton University in 1982, his J.D. from Yale Law School in 1986, and his Ph.D. in clinical psychology from the University of Michigan in 1994.

From 1998 to 1999, he was an instructor in psychology in the Department of Psychiatry at Harvard Medical School.

On November 1, 2000, Behnke became director of the Office of Ethics for the American Psychological Association.

In 2011, Behnke was awarded the Distinguished Public Service Award by the American Psychological Association "for exemplary contribution to the profession of psychology and for longstanding service as Director of the APA Ethics Office"

On July 8, 2015, Benke was removed from his position as director of the APA Ethics Office as a result of a July 2, 2015 report to the special committee of the board of directors.

== Enhanced interrogation controversy ==
On July 2, 2015, a 542-page independent review report conducted by former assistant U.S. Attorney David H. Hoffman was issued to the special committee of the board of directors of the American Psychological Association relating to ethics guidelines, enhanced interrogation techniques, and torture.

According to The Washington Post,

The probe concluded that the association's ethics director and others had "colluded with important [Department of Defense] officials to have APA issue loose, high-level ethical guidelines that did not constrain" the Pentagon in its interrogation of terrorism suspects at Guantanamo Bay, Cuba. The association's "principal motive in doing so was to align APA and curry favor with DOD."

James Risen reported in the New York Times that Behnke was among prominent psychologists who

worked closely with the C.I.A. to blunt dissent inside the agency over an interrogation program that is now known to have included torture. It also finds that officials at the American Psychological Association colluded with the Pentagon to make sure that the association's ethics policies did not hinder the ability of psychologists to be involved in the interrogation program.

According to The Guardian newspaper Behnke was fired from his job as the APA's ethics chief as a result of being involved in

recasting its ethics guidelines in a manner conducive to interrogations that, from the start, relied heavily on psychologists to design and implement techniques like waterboarding.

Nathaniel Raymond, former director of the campaign against torture at Physicians for Human Rights said,

This is the single greatest health professional ethics scandal of the 21st century.

In response, Behnke hired risk management firm Freeh Group International Solutions, headed by former Federal Bureau of Investigation director Louis Freeh, to respond to the report. Behnke's brother, John D. Behnke, is a managing director of the same risk management firm. Freeh stated that the Hoffman report grossly mischaracterized Behnke's motives and actions. According to The Guardian,

Behnke undertook "extensive efforts to manipulate" the APA's council of representatives "in an effort to undermine attempts to keep psychologists from being involved in national security interrogations", according to Hoffman.

== Personal life ==
Behnke is friends with Orrin B. Evans Professor at USC Gould School of Law Elyn Saks according to her 2007 memoir The Center Cannot Hold: My Journey Through Madness.

== Publications ==
- The Essentials of Massachusetts Mental Health Law (with James T. Hilliard), Apr 17, 1998, ISBN 0393702499
- The Essentials of New York Mental Health Law (with Michael L. Perlin and Marvin Bernstein), Apr 17, 2004, ISBN 0393703088
- The Essentials of Florida Mental Health Law (with Alina M. Perez and Bruce J. Winick), March 17, 2000, ISBN 0393703096
- Behnke, Stephen, Ethics and interrogations: Comparing and contrasting the American Psychological, American Medical and American Psychiatric Association positions, American Psychological Association, July/August 2006, Vol 37, No. 7
- Behnke, S. H., & Jones, S. E., Ethics and ethics codes for psychologists (2012) In S. Knapp, M. Gottlieb, M. Handelsman, & L. VandeCreek, APA handbook in Psychology: Vol. 1. APA handbook of ethics in psychology: Moral foundations and common themes (pp. 43–74). Washington, DC: American Psychological Association.
- Behnke, S. H., & Moorehead-Slaughter, Ethics, human rights, and interrogations: The position of the American Psychological Association (2012) In J. H. Laurence & M. D. Matthews (Eds.), The Oxford handbook of military psychology (pp. 50–62). New York, NY: Oxford University Press.
- Jekyll on Trial: Multiple Personality Disorder and Criminal Law (with Elyn Saks), NYU Press (1997), ASIN: B00ZT0R6P8
