= Robert Rasmussen =

Robert Rasmussen may refer to:

- Robert L. Rasmussen (born 1930), American military artist
- Robert K. Rasmussen, American legal scholar and dean
