= Psychiatric Rehabilitation Association =

- Abbreviation: PRA
- Formation: 1975; 51 years ago
- Founders: Jerry Dincin; Lois Evey; Samuel Grob; Julius Lanoil; Chris MacFadden; Marshall Rubin; Irv Rutman; James Schmidt; David Shiel; Donald Springer; Florence Strindberg; Henry Tanaka; Marvin Weinstein
- Founded at: Pennsylvania
- Legal status: Nonprofit
- Headquarters: 212 E. LaSalle Ave, Suite 220 South Bend, IN. 46617
- Fields: Psychosocial & psychiatric rehabilitation
- Main organ: Psychiatric Rehabilitation Journal
- Website: https://www.psychrehabassociation.org
- Formerly called: United States Psychiatric Rehabilitation Association; International Association of Psychosocial Rehabilitation Services

The Psychiatric Rehabilitation Association (PRA) is a professional association for practitioners of psychiatric rehabilitation who serve persons and families living with psychiatric disorders. As of 2016, Colleen Eubanks is chief executive officer.

== History ==
PRA was originally incorporated as the International Association of Psychosocial Rehabilitation Services. It was founded by the directors of the original 13 psychosocial rehabilitation centers in the United States, PRA promotes evidence-based recovery from mental illness practice and works with government agencies, universities and other institutions. In 2004, the name changed to United States Psychiatric Rehabilitation Association. In 2013, it removed the national designation from its name and became the Psychiatric Rehabilitation Association.

== Publications ==
In 1982, PRA partnered with the Center for Psychiatric Rehabilitation at Boston University to publish the Psychiatric Rehabilitation Journal. The journal is now published quarterly by the American Psychological Association. PRA also publishes a weekly newsletter, Recovery Update.

== Professional certification ==
The PRA issues two professional certifications as qualifications for mental health practitioners: the Certified Psychiatric Rehabilitation Practitioner (CPRP) and the Child and Family Resiliency Practitioner (CFRP).
