= Richard Bentall =

British psychologist

Richard Bentall FBA
- Born: 30 September 1956 (age 70); Sheffield, United Kingdom
- Education: University College of North Wales (Bangor), University of Liverpool, University of Wales, Swansea
- Known for: Researching schizophrenia and bipolar disorder
- Awards: British Academy Fellow, May Davidson Award
- Scientific career
- Fields: Clinical psychology
- Workplaces: National Health Service, Bangor University, University of Manchester, University of Liverpool, University of Sheffield

Richard Bentall FBA (born 30 September 1956) is a professor of clinical psychology at the University of Sheffield in the UK.

== Early life ==
Richard Pendrill Bentall was born in Sheffield in the United Kingdom. After attending Uppingham School in Rutland and then High Storrs School in his home town, he attended the University College of North Wales, Bangor as an undergraduate before registering for a PhD in Experimental Psychology at the same institution.

== Career ==
After being awarded his doctorate, he moved to the University of Liverpool to undertake professional training as a clinical psychologist. He later returned to his alma mater of Liverpool to work as a lecturer, after a brief stint working for the National Health Service as a forensic clinical psychologist. Later, he studied for an MA in Philosophy Applied to Healthcare from the University of Wales, Swansea. He was eventually promoted to Professor of Clinical Psychology at the University of Liverpool. There, his team developed the Liverpool University Neuroleptic Side-Effect Rating Scale. In 1999, he accepted a position at the University of Manchester, collaborating with researchers based there who were working in understanding the treatment of psychotic experiences. After returning in 2007 to a professorial position at Bangor University, where he retains an honorary professorship, he returned to the University of Liverpool in 2011, before moving to the University of Sheffield in 2017. His research continues to focus on the psychological mechanisms of severe mental illness and social factors that affect these mechanisms, which has led to a recent interest in public mental health. In 1989, he received the British Psychological Society's Division of Clinical Psychology 'May Davidson Award', an annual award for outstanding contributions to the field of clinical psychology, in the first ten years after qualifying. In 2014 he was elected a Fellow of the British Academy, the United Kingdom's national academy for the humanities and social sciences.

== Research ==
He has previously published research on differences between human and animal operant conditioning and on the treatment of chronic fatigue syndrome. However, he is best known for his work in psychosis, especially the psychological processes responsible for delusions and hallucinations and has published extensively in these areas. His research on persecutory (paranoid) delusions has explored the idea that these arise from dysfunctional attempts to regulate self-esteem, so that the paranoid patient attributes negative experiences to the deliberate actions of other people. His research on hallucinations has identified a failure of source monitoring (the process by which events are attributed to either the self or external sources) as responsible for hallucinating patients' inability to recognize that their inner speech (verbal thought) belongs to themselves. Along with many other British researchers, he has used these discoveries to inform the development of new psychological interventions for psychosis, based on cognitive behavioral therapy (CBT). This work has included randomized controlled trials of CBT for first episode patients and patients experiencing an at risk mental state for psychosis.

In a 1992 thought experiment, Bentall proposed that happiness might be classified as a psychiatric disorder. The purpose of the paper was to demonstrate the impossibility of defining psychiatric disorder without reference to values. The paper was mentioned on the satirical television program Have I Got News for You and quoted by the novelist Philip Roth in his novel Sabbath's Theater.

He has edited and written several books, most notably Madness Explained, which was a winner of the British Psychological Society Book Award in 2004. In this book, he advocates a psychological approach to the psychoses, rejects the concept of schizophrenia and considers symptoms worthwhile investigating in contrast to the Kraepelinian syndromes. (Refuting Kraepelin's big idea that serious mental illness can be divided into discrete types is the starting chapter of the book.) A review by Paul Broks in The Sunday Times summarised its position as: "Like Szasz, Bentall is firmly opposed to the biomedical model, but he also takes issue with extreme social relativists who would deny the reality of madness." In the book, Bentall also argues that no clear distinction exists between those diagnosed with mental illnesses and the "well". While this notion is more widely accepted in psychiatry when it comes to anxiety and depression, Bentall insists that schizotypal experiences are also common.

In 2009 he published Doctoring The Mind: Is Our Current Treatment of Mental Illness Really Any Good? A review of this book by neuro-scientist Roy Sugarman argued that it allied itself with the anti-psychiatry movement in its critiques of biological psychiatry. The review in PsycCRITIQUES was more nuanced, pointing out that Bentall did not reject psycho-pharmacology, but that he was concerned over its overuse.

In 2010, Bentall and John Read co-authored a literature review on "The effectiveness of electroconvulsive therapy" (ECT). It examined placebo-controlled studies and concluded ECT had minimal benefits for people with depression and schizophrenia. The authors said "given the strong evidence of persistent and, for some, permanent brain dysfunction, primarily evidenced in the form of retrograde and anterograde amnesia, and the evidence of a slight but significant increased risk of death, the cost-benefit analysis for ECT is so poor that its use cannot be scientifically justified". Psychiatrists, however, sharply criticized this paper in passing by calling it an "evidence-poor paper with an anti-ECT agenda".

In 2012, Bentall and collaborators in Maastricht published a meta-analysis of the research literature on childhood trauma and psychosis, considering epidemiological, case-control, and prospective studies. This study found that the evidence that childhood trauma confers a risk of adult psychosis is highly consistent, with children who have experienced trauma (sexual abuse, physical abuse, loss of a parent or bullying) being approximately three times more likely to become psychotic than non-traumatized children; there was a dose-response effect (the most severely traumatized children were even more likely to become psychotic) suggesting that the effect is causal. This finding, and other findings suggesting that there are many social risk factors for severe mental illness, has led to Bentall's current interest in public mental health.

== Bibliography ==
- Bentall, Richard (2009). Doctoring the mind: is our current treatment of mental illness really any good?. NYU Press. ISBN 978-0-8147-9148-6. (The UK title is Doctoring the Mind: Why Psychiatric Treatments Fail)
- Bentall, Richard (July 2014). "The Search for Elusive Structure: A Promiscuous Realist Case for Researching Specific Psychotic Experiences Such as Hallucinations". Schizophrenia Bulletin. 40 (Suppl 4): S198–201. doi:10.1093/schbul/sbu044. PMC 4141316. PMID 24936080.
- Bentall, Richard (July 2013). "Would a rose, by any other name, smell sweeter?". Psychological Medicine. 43 (7): 1560–1562. doi:10.1017/S0033291713000925. PMID 23769384.
- Read, J; Bentall, RP; Fosse, R (October–December 2009). "Time to abandon the bio-bio-bio model of psychosis: Exploring the epigenetic and psychological mechanisms by which adverse life events lead to psychotic symptoms". Epidemiologia e Psichiatria Sociale. 18 (4): 299–310. doi:10.1017/S1121189X00000257. PMID 20170043.
- Varese, F; Smeets, F; Drukker, M; Lieverse, R; Lataster, T; Viechtbauer, W; Read, J; van Os, J; Bentall, RP (29 March 2012). "Childhood Adversities Increase the Risk of Psychosis: A Meta-analysis of Patient-Control, Prospective- and Cross-sectional Cohort Studies". Schizophrenia Bulletin. 38 (4): 661–671. doi:10.1093/schbul/sbs050. PMC 3406538. PMID 22461484.
- Morrison, A. P. & Renton, & J & French P & Bentall, R. P. (2008) Think You're Crazy? Think Again: A Resource Book for Cognitive Therapy for Psychosis London: Routledge. ISBN 978-1-58391-837-1
- Bentall, R. P. (2003) Madness Explained: Psychosis and Human Nature London: Penguin Books Ltd. ISBN 0-7139-9249-2
- Bentall, Richard (1999). Why There Will Never Be a Convincing Theory of Schizophrenia. In S. Rose (ed). From brains to consciousness? Essays on the new sciences of mind London: Penguin Books.
- Bentall, R. P. & Slade, P. D. (eds) (1992) Reconstructing Schizophrenia London: Routledge. ISBN 0-415-01574-X
- Bentall, R. P. & Slade, P. D. (1988) Sensory Deception: A Scientific Analysis of Hallucination Johns Hopkins University Press. ISBN 0-8018-3760-X

== See also ==
- Spectrum (psychiatry)
