= Franita Tolson =

American lawyer and academic

Academic background
- Education: Truman State University (BA); University of Chicago (JD)

Franita Tolson is an American lawyer and law professor. She is the dean and George T. and Harriet E. Pfleger Chair in Law at the USC Gould School of Law. Tolson was previously a faculty member at the Florida State University College of Law from 2009 to 2017.

== Life ==
Tolson completed a B.A. in history, cum laude, at the Truman State University in Kirksville, Missouri, in 2001. She earned a J.D. from the University of Chicago Law School in 2005 and was a member of the University of Chicago Law Review.

From 2005 to 2007, Tolson was a law clerk for Rubén Castillo of the United States District Court for the Northern District of Illinois. She was a law clerk for Ann Claire Williams of the United States Court of Appeals for the Seventh Circuit from 2007 to 2008.

Tolson was a visiting assistant professor at the Northwestern University Pritzker School of Law from 2008 to 2009. Tolson joined the Florida State University College of Law in 2009 as an assistant professor. In 2012, she became the Betty T. Ferguson Professor of Voting Rights. She was promoted to associate professor with tenure in 2014. Tolson joined the USC Gould School of Law as a visiting professor of law in February 2016. She became a professor of law in June 2017 and the vice dean for faculty and academic affairs in July 2019. She is the George T. and Harriet E. Pfleger Chair in Law at the USC Gould School of Law. Since April 2021, Tolson holds a courtesy appointment as a professor of political science and international relations. She is co-author of The Law of Democracy, an election law casebook, and her forthcoming book In Congress We Trust? covers voting rights enforcement in the U.S. from its founding through the Jim Crow era.

Effective April 1, 2024, Tolson became the dean of the USC Gould School of Law, while holding the George T. and Harriet E. Pfleger Chair in Law. She is the first Black dean in the 123-year history of USC Gould School of Law and the first woman to hold the position in over four decades.

== Selected works ==
- Issacharoff, Samuel; Karlan, Pamela S.; Pildes, Richard; Persily, Nathaniel; Tolson, Franita (2022). The Law of Democracy, Legal Structure of the Political Process (6th ed.). Foundation Press. ISBN 9781684677900.
