= Elyn Saks =

American legal scholar

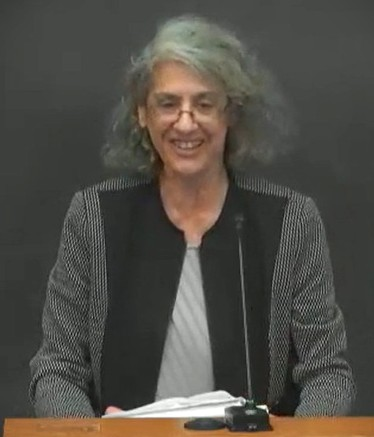
- Saks speaks at Yale Law School in 2017
- Education: Vanderbilt University, Oxford University, Yale Law School, New Center for Psychoanalysis
- Awards: MacArthur Fellowship
- Scientific career
- Workplaces: University of Bridgeport School of Law, University of Southern California Law School, New Center for Psychoanalysis

Elyn R. Saks is an American legal scholar who is an associate dean and Orrin B. Evans Professor of Law, Psychology, and Psychiatry and the Behavioral Sciences at the University of Southern California Gould Law School, an expert in mental health law, and a MacArthur Foundation Fellowship winner. Saks lives with schizophrenia and has written about her experience with the illness in her award-winning best-selling autobiography, The Center Cannot Hold, published by Hyperion Books in 2007. She is also a cancer survivor.

== Academic background ==
Saks was an instructor at the University of Bridgeport School of Law before joining the USC Law faculty in 1989. She graduated summa cum laude from Vanderbilt University, later earning her master of letters from Oxford University as a Marshall Scholar and her J.D. from Yale Law School, where she also edited the Yale Law Journal. She holds a Ph.D. in psychoanalytic science from the New Center for Psychoanalysis. Saks is a member of Phi Beta Kappa; an affiliate member of the American Psychoanalytic Association; a board member of Mental Health Advocacy Services; founder and faculty director of The Saks Institute for Mental Health Law, Policy, and Ethics at University of Southern California Gould School of Law; and a member of the Los Angeles Psychoanalytic Foundation, Robert J. Stoller Foundation, and American Law Institute. Saks won both the Associate's Award for Creativity in Research and Scholarship and the Phi Kappa Phi Faculty Recognition Award in 2004.

== Mental illness research ==
Saks began experiencing symptoms of mental illness at eight years old, but she had her first full-blown episode when studying as a Marshall Scholar at Oxford University. Another breakdown happened while Saks was a student at Yale Law School, after which she "ended up forcibly restrained and forced to take anti-psychotic medication". Her scholarly efforts thus include taking a careful look at the destructive impact force and coercion can have on the lives of people with psychiatric illnesses, whether during treatment, or perhaps in interactions with police; the Saks Institute, for example, co-hosted a conference examining the urgent problem of how to address excessive use of force in encounters between law enforcement and individuals with mental health challenges.

Saks lives with schizophrenia and has written about her experience with the illness in her autobiography, The Center Cannot Hold: My Journey Through Madness published by Hyperion Books in 2007. While emphasizing that "illness of any kind need not define an individual" in remarking upon the different ways that mental and physical illnesses are regarded, she also tackles complex issues of identity which inevitably arise in the lives of people with psychosis.

Saks says "there's a tremendous need to implode the myths of mental illness, to put a face on it, to show people that a diagnosis does not have to lead to a painful and oblique life." Approaches include "medication (usually), therapy (often), a measure of good luck (always)—and, most of all, the inner strength to manage one's demons, if not banish them. That strength can come from any number of places ... love, forgiveness, faith in God, a lifelong friendship." Saks says "we who struggle with these disorders can lead full, happy, productive lives, if we have the right resources."

Saks has spoken of the Mental Health America Village in Long Beach that provides best practice integrated services, giving all the needed services and support in one venue. She has also said that her former psychotherapist in England does many home visits, saving the cost of hospitalisation.

On several occasions Saks has spoken to American Psychiatric Association members about being a successful professional who has had severe mental illness and her perspective on psychiatric care. In June 2012, Saks gave a TED Talk advocating for compassion toward people with mental illness.

In Los Angeles, Saks studied high-functioning people with schizophrenia. These people experienced "mild delusions or hallucinatory behavior", including successful technicians, and medical, legal, and business professionals. Many were studying toward college or graduate degrees at the time.

== Awards ==
In 2009, Saks was selected as a MacArthur Foundation fellow, receiving a $500,000 "genius grant". She used the money to establish the Saks Institute for Mental Health Law, Policy, and Ethics, which highlights one important mental health issue per academic year and is a collaborative effort between seven USC departments. Saks has had a hospital ward named after her—"The Elyn Saks Ward"—at Pelham Woods Hospital in Dorking, England. On September 14, 2020, William James College in Newton, Massachusetts awarded Saks an honorary Doctor of Humane Letters for her life-long service to people with serious mental illness. She is an elected member of the American Law Institute.

== Works ==
Saks writes mainly on legal issues and mental health, and has published numerous articles and four books:

- The Center Cannot Hold: My Journey Through Madness, ISBN 978-1-4013-0138-5
- Refusing Care: Forced Treatment and the Rights of the Mentally Ill, ISBN 978-0-226-73397-5
- Interpreting Interpretation: The Limits of Hermeneutic Psychoanalysis, ISBN 978-0-300-07603-5
- Jekyll on Trial: Multiple Personality Disorder and Criminal Law, ISBN 978-0-8147-9764-8. Coauthored by Stephen H. Behnke.

Saks's latest book, The Center Cannot Hold, was one of Time magazine's Top Ten Nonfiction Books of the Year, the Books for a Better Life Inspirational Memoir Award, and has been on The New York Times Extended Best Sellers List.

== See also ==
- List of people with schizophrenia
- Is There No Place on Earth for Me?
- Kay Redfield Jamison
- Robert Whitaker
- Peter Breggin
- James Gottstein
- Peter Lehmann
- Anatomy of an Epidemic
- David Oaks
- Rethinking Madness
- Doctoring the Mind
