= Lisa Dixon =

- Education: Harvard University (BS); Cornell University (MD); Johns Hopkins University (MPH)
- Known for: Research on people with severe mental illnesses
- Scientific career
- Fields: Psychiatry
- Workplaces: Columbia University Irving Medical Center / NewYork-Presbyterian Hospital; New York State Psychiatric Institute; University of Maryland, Baltimore

Lisa Dixon is a professor of psychiatry at the Columbia University Irving Medical Center and the Director of the Division of Behavioral Health Services and Policy Research within the Department of Psychiatry. Her research focuses on improving the quality of care for individuals diagnosed with serious mental illnesses. She directs the Center for Practice Innovations (CPI) at the New York State Psychiatric Institute, where she oversees the implementation of evidence-based practices for individuals with serious mental illnesses for the New York State Office of Mental Health. She leads OnTrackNY, a statewide treatment program for adolescents and young adults experiencing their first episode of psychosis.

Dixon is also a professor of Psychiatry at the University of Maryland School of Medicine, where her primary research interests have focused on persons with severe mental illnesses who have co-morbid medical and substance use disorders, homelessness, and other vulnerabilities as well as on services to family members. Previously, she was the Director of the Division of Health Services Research within the Department of Psychiatry at Maryland and Director of Education and Residency Training at Maryland.

In 2002, she joined the Veterans Affairs Capital Health Care Network and is currently the Director of Health Services Research and Education Resource Development.

Dixon received her bachelor's degree in Economics from Harvard in 1980 and her medical degree from Weill Medical College of Cornell University in 1985. After completing her residency at the Payne Whitney Psychiatric Clinic in 1989, she completed a research fellowship at the Maryland Psychiatric Research Center. She later earned a Masters in Public Health from Johns Hopkins University.

Dixon was inspired to pursue medicine due to her brother's struggle with schizophrenia and a sociology course by Paul Starr.

Dixon has collaborated with the National Alliance on Mental Illness (NAMI) to establish the effectiveness of NAMI's Family to Family education program. In 2017, she became the editor-in-chief of Psychiatric Services, a journal of the American Psychiatric Association

In April 2022, she began doing research on treating psychosis in childhood and early adulthood, motivated by her brother who has schizophrenia. Her brother had no treatment as he was displaying early signs of psychosis and Dr. Dixon believes that his outcome would have been different if they intervened earlier. Dr. Dixon also emphasizes how psychosis is negatively portrayed in the media, and this might prolong the psychosis.

== Areas of Expertise ==
Bipolar Disorder, Psychopharmacology, Mood Disorders, Obsessives Compulsive Disorder (OCD)

== Awards ==
She is a recipient of NAMI's Scientific Research Award, NAMI NYC Metro's Volunteer of the Year Award and NAMI-NYS's Dr. Lewis Opler Memorial Award acknowledging her dedicated support for the organization.
