= Steve Adams (writer) =

American author

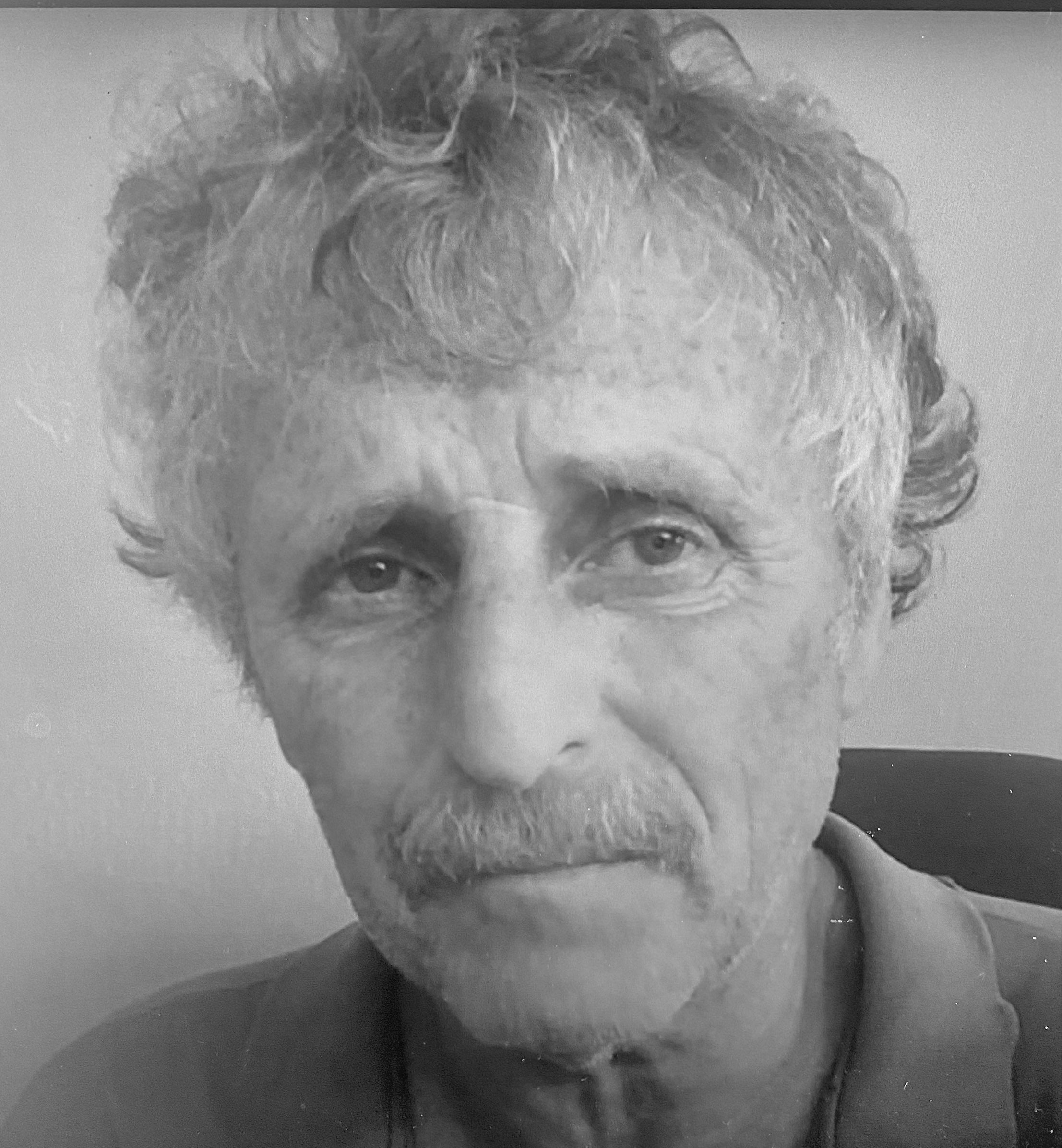
- Adams in 2022
- Born: Steven Saint Lawrence Adams; February 8, 1947 (age 79)
- Other name: Waldo Mellon
- Education: Dartmouth College
- Parent(s): Kurt Vonnegut (uncle and adoptive father)
- Relatives: Edith Vonnegut, Mark Vonnegut (cousins and adoptive siblings)

Steven Saint Lawrence Adams (born February 8, 1947) is an American author and screenwriter who also uses the penname Waldo Mellon. He wrote Envy (2004), starring Ben Stiller and Jack Black. Adams conceived the idea with long-time friend Larry David. They met while both were comedy writers for Fridays, a Saturday Night Live inspired show in the early 1980s. Adams also wrote Waiting for Forever (2010) starring Tom Sturridge, Rachel Bilson, and Blythe Danner as well as No Stranger Than Love (2015) starring Alison Brie and Colin Hanks.

In 2014, Adams wrote and self-published his first book What's What And What To Do About It under the pen name Waldo Mellon. The book was published in March 1, 2022 by Seven Stories Press.

== Early life and family ==
Adams's uncle is Kurt Vonnegut (1922-2007), an American novelist known for wryly satirical science fiction. In 1958, Adams' mother, Alice Vonnegut Adams, died of cancer two days after her husband, James Carmalt Adams, was killed in a train accident. Vonnegut, Alice's brother, adopted Adams and his three brothers and raised them in Cape Cod, Massachusetts. Adams graduated from Dartmouth College in 1969 with B.A. in English. He currently lives in Massachusetts, with his wife Jeannie.
