= Charles Whitebread =

American legal scholar (1943 - 2008)

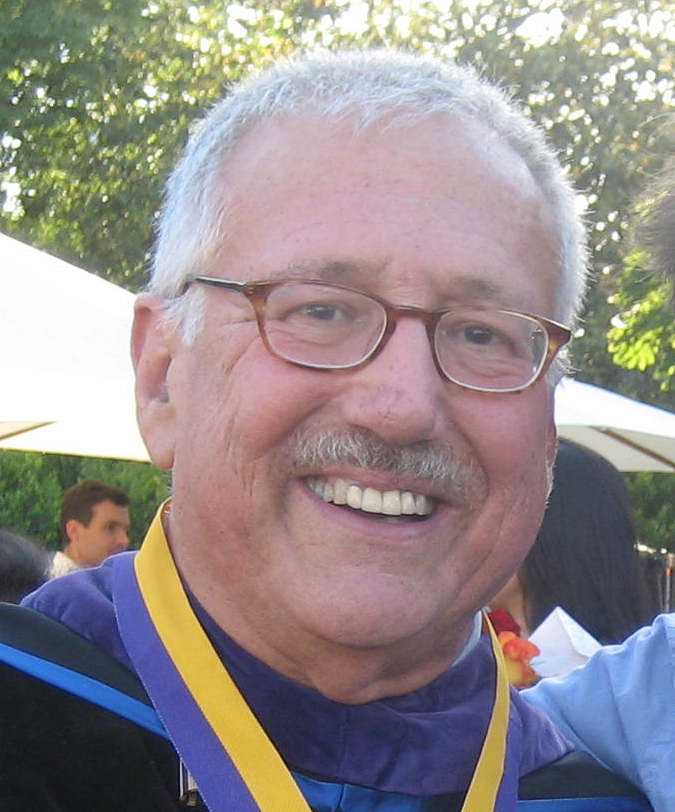
- Born: Charles H. Whitebread; April 2, 1943; Montgomery County, Maryland, U.S.
- Died: September 16, 2008 (aged 65); Santa Monica, California, U.S.

Academic background
- Education: Yale Law School; Princeton University

Academic work
- Discipline: Law
- Sub-discipline: Criminal Law; Criminal Procedure
- Institutions: University of Southern California; University of Virginia School of Law

Charles H. Whitebread (April 2, 1943 – September 16, 2008) was the George T. Pfleger Professor of Law at the University of Southern California Law School. He was an authority on criminal law and criminal procedure, writing and lecturing on those and other subjects throughout the United States.

== Early life ==
Whitebread was born on April 2, 1943, in Montgomery County, Maryland. He attended Princeton University (1965), where he was an honors graduate, and Yale Law School (1968), where he was an editor for the Yale Law Journal.

== Academic career ==
After briefly working at Wilmer Cutler & Pickering, he became a professor at the University of Virginia School of Law, where he taught for 13 years, and then moved to the University of Southern California Law School.

Whitebread was also a lecturer in criminal law and criminal procedure for BarBri.

It is believed that Whitebread taught more law students than any other professor in the country due to his long service and the nationwide publication of his criminal law and procedure lectures. It is also thought that Whitebread instructed more police officers than any other instructor in modern history through his long years as an instructor at the FBI school at Quantico.

Whitebread gave the keynote speech at the American Psychology and Law Society (APLS) Annual Conference in Jacksonville, Florida on March 6, 2008.

=== Writings ===
Whitebread was a prolific legal writer, who published a dozen books and over 30 law review articles, which includes Criminal Procedure, Children in the Legal System, The Eight Secrets of Top Exam Performance in Law School, and co-authored The Forbidden Fruit and the Tree of Knowledge: An Inquiry into the Legal History of American Marijuana Prohibition in the 1970 Virginia Law Review, which became the seminal work for The Marihuana Conviction originally published in 1974.
