= Southern California Review of Law and Social Justice =

- Discipline: Law
- Language: English

Publication details
- Former names: Southern California Review of Law & Women's Studies
- History: 1992; 34 years ago – present
- Publisher: University of Southern California (United States)
- Frequency: Triannual

Standard abbreviations
- Bluebook: S. Cal. Rev. L. & Soc. Just.
- ISO 4: South. Calif. Rev. Law Soc. Justice

Indexing
- ISSN: 1935-2778
- LCCN: 2006250010
- OCLC no.: 70252219

Links
- Journal homepage; Online archive

The Southern California Review of Law and Social Justice is an honors journal of legal scholarship that examines issues at the intersection of social justice and the law published by an independent student group at the USC Gould School of Law.

== Introduction ==
The Southern California Review of Law and Social Justice (RLSJ) promotes the discussion and examination of issues lying at the intersection of social justice and the law. RLSJ publishes legal narratives and analyses of case law and legislation that address the law's interaction with historically underrepresented groups and highlight the law's potential as an instrument of positive social change. These narratives and analyses borrow from the perspectives of a wide range of disciplines. The goal of RLSJ is to influence the development of the law in ways that encourage full and equal participation of all people in politics and society.
