= Edith Vonnegut =

American painter (born 1949)

- Born: December 29, 1949 (age 76); Schenectady, New York, U.S.
- Other names: Edith Vonnegut Rivera; Edith Vonnegut Squibb
- Occupation: Painter
- Parent(s): Kurt Vonnegut; Jane Marie Cox
- Relatives: Mark Vonnegut (brother); Steve Adams (cousin / adopted brother)

Edith "Edie" Vonnegut (born December 29, 1949) is an American painter.

Her work—most of which juxtaposes heavenly beings and mundane activities—has been showcased at galleries across the United States, and is featured in the book Domestic Goddesses, along with her humorous commentary.

== Life and career ==
Born December 29, 1949 in Schenectady, New York, Vonnegut is the daughter of novelist Kurt Vonnegut and his first wife, Jane Marie (Cox), and the sister of Mark Vonnegut and Nanette Vonnegut. Her paternal grandmother is Edith Lieber Vonnegut. She grew up in Barnstable, Massachusetts and her parents supported her desire to become an artist. She graduated from Boston Museum School of Fine Arts and University of Iowa.

When her father became famous she got swept into the limelight with him, living in New York City for fifteen years until returning to Cape Cod to start a family. While initially concerned having children would doom her career as an artist, it turned out to be a fertile source for her painting. Since 1985, she has been married to John Squibb; they have two sons together.

She was once married to television personality Geraldo Rivera and has published under the names Edith Vonnegut, Edith Vonnegut Rivera, and Edith Vonnegut Squibb. Vonnegut studied transcendental meditation with her mother, Jane, in 1967.

She edited a collection of her father's love letters to her mother that he wrote during his service during World War II in a book Love, Kurt: The Vonnegut Love Letters, 1941–1945. Some letters were typed, while others were handwritten and illustrated. They foreshadowed the person Kurt Vonnegut would become and reveal that Jane's advice and counsel were instrumental in shaping the writer he became.

== Partial bibliography ==
- Vonnegut Rivera, Edith (1973). Nora's Tale. R. W. Baron. ISBN 978-0-87777-048-0. (dedication: "for Geraldo")
- Vonnegut, Edith (1998). Domestic Goddesses. Pomegranate. ISBN 978-0-7649-0687-9.
- Vonnegut, Kurt (2020). Vonnegut, Edith (ed.). Love, Kurt: The Vonnegut Love Letters, 1941-1945. New York: Random House. ISBN 978-0-593-13301-9.
