= Edward McCaffery =

American educator

- Born: c. 1958

Academic background
- Education: University of Southern California; Harvard Law School; Yale University

Edward McCaffery (born c. 1959) is an American tax law professor at the University of Southern California Law School (USC) and also a visiting professor of Law and Economics at the California Institute of Technology (Caltech).

McCaffery studies tax policy, tax structures, public finance theory, including behavioral public finance, as well as property law and theory, intellectual property, and law and economics.

== Early life and education ==
A graduate of Yale College with a bachelor's degree in Latin and philosophy, McCaffery received his J.D. from Harvard Law School and a Master's degree in economics from the University of Southern California.

== Career ==
He served as a clerk to Chief Justice Robert Wilentz of the New Jersey Supreme Court and was an attorney with Titchell, Maltzman, Mark, Bass, Ohleyer & Mishel before joining the USC Law faculty in 1989. He held the Maurice Jones, Jr., Professorship in Law from 1998 to 2004 and has served as a visiting professor of law and economics at Caltech since 1994. He has chaired the USC Institute on Federal Taxation since 1997, and he founded the USC–Caltech Center for the Study of Law and Politics and served as its director from 2000 to 2003. He is an elected fellow of the American Law Institute (ALI) and the American College of Tax Counsel. McCaffery was also Senior Counsel in the Los Angeles office of Seyfarth Shaw LLP.

At USC, McCaffery is Robert C. Packard Trustee Chair in Law and Professor of Law, Economics and Political Science, where he teaches courses on federal income taxation, property, intellectual property, and tax policy; at Caltech, he teaches courses concerning the intersection of law and economics, and courses concerning the intersection of law and technology. He was the interim dean at the USC Gould School of Law in 2006.

In addition to law review articles, McCaffery wrote two books: Fair Not Flat: How to Make the Tax System Better and Simpler (advocating a progressive consumption tax based on spending rather than income) and Taxing Women (discussing the gender inequity of the current U.S. income tax code which penalizes working women).

His other writings include "Cognitive Theory and Tax", "Framing the Jury: Cognitive Perspectives on Pain and Suffering Awards" (with Daniel Kahneman and Matthew Spitzer), and "Slouching Towards Equality: Gender Discrimination, Market Efficiency, and Social Change." McCaffery has served as an official consultant to the Russian Federation to help design a comprehensive tax code.

McCaffey coined the phrase "Buy, Borrow, Die." to explain how the rich use the American tax system to their advantage. He came up with it in the mid-1990s to his help students understand how the wealthy avoid paying taxes: Buy an asset that will increase in value, borrow money to live off based on the appreciating asset and avoid the 20% capital gains tax for selling an asset by holding it until death and bequeathing it to loved ones.
