= Psychiatric rehabilitation =

Process for psychological recovery

Psychiatric rehabilitation, also known as psychosocial rehabilitation, and sometimes simplified to psych rehab by providers, is the process of restoration of community functioning and well-being of an individual diagnosed in mental health or emotional disorder and who may be considered to have a psychiatric disability.

Society affects the psychology of an individual by setting a number of rules, expectations and laws. Psychiatric rehabilitation work is undertaken by rehabilitation counselors (especially the individuals educated in psychiatric rehabilitation), licensed professional counselors (who work in the mental health field), psych rehab consultants or specialists (in private businesses), university level Masters and PhD levels, classes of related disciplines in mental health (psychiatrists, social workers, psychologists, occupational therapists) and community support or allied health workers represented in the new direct support professional workforce in the United States (e.g., psychiatric aides).

These workers seek to effect changes in a person's environment and in a person's ability to deal with his/her environment, so as to facilitate improvement in symptoms or personal distress and life outcomes. These services often "combine pharmacologic treatment (often required for program admission), independent living and social skills training, psychological support to clients and their families, housing, vocational rehabilitation and employment, social support and network enhancement and access to leisure activities." The key role of professionals is to generate insight about the illness with the help of demonstration of symptoms and prognosis to the patients. There is often a focus on challenging stigma and prejudice to enable social inclusion, on working collaboratively in order to empower clients, and sometimes on a goal of full recovery. The latter is now widely known as a recovery approach or model. Recovery is a process rather than an outcome. It is a personal journey that is about the rediscovery of self in the process of learning to live with the debilitations of the illness rather than being defined by illness with hope, planning and community engagement.

New approaches in these fields include a person-centered approach to recovery, client-centered therapy based upon Carl Rogers, and user-service direction (as approved in the U.S. by the Centers for Medicare and Medicaid Services).

== Definition ==
Psychiatric rehabilitation is not a practice but a field of academic study or discipline, similar to social work or political science; other definitions may place it as a specialty of community rehabilitation or physical medicine and rehabilitation. It is aligned with the community support development of the National Institute on Mental Health begun in the 1970s, and is marked by a rigorous tradition of research, training and technical assistance, and information dissemination regarding a critical population group (e.g., psychiatric disability) in the US and worldwide. The field is responsible for developing and testing new models of community service for this population group.

The Psychiatric Rehabilitation Association provides this definition of psychiatric rehabilitation:

Psychiatric rehabilitation promotes recovery, full community integration, and improved quality of life for persons who have been diagnosed with any mental health condition that seriously impairs their ability to lead meaningful lives. Psychiatric rehabilitation services are collaborative, person-directed and individualized. These services are an essential element of the health care and human services spectrum, and should be evidence-based. They focus on helping individuals develop skills and access resources needed to increase their capacity to be successful and satisfied in the living, working, learning, and social environments of their choice.

The term was added to the U.S. National Library of Medicine's Medical Subject Headings in 2016. There, psychiatric rehabilitation is defined as a:

Specialty field that promotes recovery, community functioning, and increased well-being of individuals diagnosed with mental disorders that impair their ability to live meaningful lives.

== History ==
From the 1960s and 1970s, the process of de-institutionalization meant that many more individuals with mental health problems were able to live in their communities rather than being confined to mental institutions. Medication and psychotherapy were the two major treatment approaches, with little attention given to supporting and facilitating daily functioning and social interaction. Therapeutic interventions often had little impact on daily living, socialization and work opportunities. There were often barriers to social inclusion in the form of stigma and prejudice.

Psychiatric rehabilitation work emerged with the aim of helping the community integration and independence of individuals with mental health problems. "Psychiatric rehabilitation" and "psychosocial rehabilitation" became used interchangeably, as terms for the same practice. These approaches may merge with or conflict with approaches based in the psychiatric survivors movement, including the concept of user-controlled personal assistance services.

In the 1980s, the US Department of Education, National Institute on Disability Research and Rehabilitation, revised a Rehabilitation Research and Training Center program to meet the new needs in the community of special population groups. A priority center, published in the Federal Register, was the Rehabilitation Research and Training Center in Psychiatric Disabilities (awarded to William Anthony's Boston University Center). As of 2015, it remains a priority center, providing nationwide assistance and serving as flagship center internationally.

With the founding of Psychosocial Rehabilitation Canada in 2004, the professional organization International Association of Psychosocial Rehabilitation Services (IAPSRS) changed its name to United States Psychiatric Rehabilitation Association (USPRA) and the trend is toward the use of "psychiatric rehabilitation". In 2013, USPRA removed the national designation from its name, becoming the Psychiatric Rehabilitation Association (PRA).

=== Academic discipline ===
In 2012, Temple University was funded in the field of psychiatric disabilities for a national center with the National Institute on Disability and Rehabilitation Research (NIDRR), United States Department of Education, having this population group as a priority. Boston University's Center on Psychiatric Rehabilitation's director is President-Elect of the NAARTC program and Boston University College of Health and Rehabilitation Sciences (Sargent College) awards a Rehabilitation Science Doctor of Science (ScD) degree in the field in which it awards no separate mental health specialty degree (such as occupational therapy). Master' program in psychiatric rehabilitation was part of an MA degree in rehabilitation counseling in the School of Education, Syracuse University and courses were funded in part through the federal Rehabilitation Research and Training Program (now part of National Institute on Disability, Independent Living and Rehabilitation Research).

== Theory ==
The theoretical base for psychosocial then psychiatric rehabilitation is community support theory as the foundational theory; it is aligned with integration and community integration theories, psychosocial theories, and the rehabilitation and educational paradigms. Its fluid nature is due to variability in development and integration into other essential fields such as family support theories (for this population group) which has already developed its own evidence-based parent education models.

The concept of psychiatric rehabilitation is associated with the field of community rehabilitation and later on social psychiatry and is not based on a medical model of disability or the concept of mental illness which is often associated with the words "mental health". However, it can also incorporate elements of a social model of disability as part of progressive professional community field. The academic field developed concurrently with the formation of new mental health agencies in the US, now often offering supported housing services.

The Journal of Psychosocial Rehabilitation, then renamed the Journal of Psychiatric Rehabilitation, traces the development of the field over a period of several decades. The academic discipline psychiatric rehabilitation has contributed new models of services such as supported education, has cross-validated models from other fields (e.g., supported employment), has developed the first university-based community living models for populations with "severe mental illness", developed institutional to community training and technical assistance, developed the degree programs at the university levels, offers leadership institutes, and worked collaboratively to expand and upgrade older models such as clubhouses and transitional employment services, among others.

Psychiatric rehabilitation was developed and formulated as a new profession of community workers (not medical psychiatry which is an MD awarded by a Medical School) which could assist both in deinstitutionalization (e.g., systems conversion) and in community development in the US. It represents the first Master's and Ph.D. classes in the US to specialize in a rehabilitation discipline focused on community versus institutions or campuses. In the US, it also represents a movement toward evidence-based practices, critical for the development of viable community support services.

Psychosocial services, in contrast, have been associated with the term "mental health" as part of community support movement nationwide since the 1970s which has an academic and political base. These services, which have roots in education, psychology and mental health (and community services) administration, were basic funded services of new community mental health agencies offering community living and professionalized community support since the 1970s. Mental health service agencies or multi-service agencies in the non-profit and voluntary sectors form a critical delivery system for psychosocial services. In the 2000s, a sometime similar but sometimes alternative approach (variability and fidelity of provider implementation in the field) employs the concept of psychosocial recovery.

Psychiatric rehabilitation was promulgated in the US through Boston University's Rehabilitation Research and Training Center on Psychiatric Rehabilitation led by Dr. William Anthony and Marianne D. Farkas, as well as other professors and teachers such as Julie Ann Racino, Steve Murphy and Bonnie Shoultz of Syracuse University (1989–1991) who also support a generic community approach to education. The concept has been integrated with a community support approach, including supported housing/housing and support, recreation, employment and support, culture/gender and class, families and survivors, family support, and community and systems change.

Problems experienced by people with psychiatric disabilities are thought to include difficulties understanding or dealing with interpersonal situations (e.g., misinterpreting social cues, not knowing how to respond), prejudice or bullying from others because they may seem different, problems coping with stress (including daily hassles such as travel or shopping), difficulty concentrating and finding energy and motivation. People leaving psychiatric centers after long-term hospitalizations, an outdated practice, may also have need to assist with injuries that may have occurred and community integration.

Psychiatric rehabilitation is distinct from the concept of independent living and consumer-controlled services which have been written about and promoted by psychiatric survivors. The psychiatric rehabilitation concept is separated from the psychiatric survivor concept, in education and training of individuals with psychiatric disorders, in that psychiatric survivors tend to operate services and control funding.

=== Principles ===
The mission of psychiatric rehabilitation is to enable with best practices of illness management, psychosocial functioning, and personal satisfaction. Treatments and practices towards this is guided by principles. There are seven strategic principles:

1. Enabling a normal life.
2. Advocating structural changes for improved accessibility to pharmacological services and availability of psycho-social services.
3. Person-centered treatment.
4. Actively involving support systems.
5. Coordination of efficient services.
6. Strength-based approach.
7. Rehabilitation is not time specific but goal specific in succeeding.

The peer-provider approach is among the psychosocial rehabilitation practices guided by these principles. Recovery through rehabilitation is defined possible without complete remission of their illness, it is geared towards aiding the individual in attaining optimum mental health and well-being.

== Services ==
Psychiatric rehabilitation services may include: community residential services, workplace accommodations, supported employment or education, social firms, assertive community treatment (or outreach) teams assisting with social service agencies, medication management (e.g., self-medication training and support), housing, programs, employment, family issues, coping skills and activities of daily living and socialising. Traditionally, "24-hour" service programs (supervised and regulated options) were based upon the concept of instrumental and daily living skills as formulated in the World Health Organization (WHO) definition.

Psychiatric rehabilitation is illustrated by agency models which are offered by traditional and non-traditional service providers, and may be considered to be integrated (e.g. dispersed sites in the community) or segregated (e.g., campus-based facilities or villages). (e.g. Fountain House Model of New York City, MHA Village in Long Beach, CA)or Transitional Living Services of Buffalo or Transitional Living Services of Onondaga County, New York. Agencies supporting integration may align with normalization or integration philosophy, as opposed to the older sheltered workshop or day care models which have been criticized for underpayment of wages at the US Congressional level in the late 2000s.

Agencies may deliver cross-field best practices (e.g., supported work), consumer voices (e.g., Rae Unzicker), multiple disabilities (e.g., chemical dependency), training of its own community residential, employment, education and support service professionals, rehabilitation outcomes, and management and evaluation of its own services.

Core principles of effective psychiatric rehabilitation (how services are delivered) must include:

- providing hope when the client lacks it,
- respect for the client wherever they are in the recovery process,
- empowering the client,
- teaching the client wellness planning, and
- emphasizing the importance for the client to develop social support networks.

Psychiatric rehabilitation (what services are delivered) varies by provider and may consist of eight main areas:

- Psychiatric (symptom management; relaxation, meditation and massage; support groups and in-home assistance)
- Health and Medical (maintaining consistency of care; family physician and mental health counseling)
- Housing (safe environments; supported housing; community residential services; group homes; apartment living)
- Basic Living Skills (personal hygiene or personal care, preparing and sharing meals, home and travel safety and skills, goal and life planning,

chores and group decision-making, shopping and appointments)

- Social (relationships, recreational and hobby, family and friends, housemates and boundaries, communications and community integration)
- Vocational and/or Educational (vocational planning, transportation assistance to employment, preparation programs (e.g., calculators), GED classes, televised education, coping skills, motivation)
- Financial (personal budget), planning for own apartment (startup funds, security deposit), household grocery; social security disability; banking accounts (savings or travel)
- Community and Legal (resources; health insurance, community recreation, memberships, legal aid society, homeownership agencies, community colleges, houses of worship, ethnic activities and clubs; employment presentations; hobby clubs; special interest stores; summer city schedules)

As of 2013, it is expected that areas such as supported housing, household management, quality medical plans, advocacy for rights, counseling, and community participation be part of the available package of options for services. Modernization in these fields includes better health care, such as women and men's health (e.g., heart disease), public and private counseling services in mental health, integrated services (for dual and multiple diagnoses), new specialized treatments (e.g., eating disorders), and understanding of trauma services and mental health. Psychiatric rehabilitation is typically associated with long term services and supports (LTSS) in the community including post secondary education as supported education.

== Educational and professional organizations ==
=== Canada ===
In Canada, Psychosocial Rehabilitation/Réadaptation Psychosociale (PSR/RPS) Canada promotes education, research and knowledge exchange in relation to evidence-based psychosocial rehabilitation and recovery-oriented practices for service-providers and those receiving services for mental health challenges. A framework of competencies for service providers (individuals and organizations) was developed and announced at the 2013 Annual National Conference in Winnipeg, Manitoba.

=== United States ===
- Boston University, Center for Psychiatric Rehabilitation
- Psychiatric Rehabilitation Association, formerly the United States Psychiatric Rehabilitation Association and International Association for Psychosocial Rehabilitation; a professional organization founded in 1975.
- Rutgers School of Health Related Professions, Department of Psychiatric Rehabilitation and Counseling Professions
