= Recovered, Not Cured =

2003 book by Richard McLean

Recovered, Not Cured: A Journey Through Schizophrenia
- Author: Richard McLean
- Language: English
- Publisher: Allen & Unwin
- Publication date: 30 April 2003 (Australia); 5 May 2005 (United States)
- Pages: 192 (first edition)
- ISBN: 978-1-86508-974-4

Recovered, Not Cured: A Journey Through Schizophrenia is a 2003 memoir by Australian graphic designer Richard McLean. Published by Allen & Unwin in Australia in April 2003, and in the United States in May 2005, Recovered, Not Cured follows McLean through his conspiratorial delusions, drug use, friendships, traveling, prodromal phase, relationships, and career while living with schizophrenia. Interspersed throughout are McLean's artwork and messages about the illness taken off of the Internet.

The book received mostly positive reviews upon release, though one reviewer noted that because of McLean's strong support from family and friends, the memoir can overshadow some of the negative and commonplace results of living with schizophrenia. After publication, Recovered, Not Cured received "Highly Commended" in the 2003 Human Rights Award Arts Non-fiction category, presented by the Australian Human Rights and Equal Opportunity Commission, and won 2004 Book of the Year from SANE Australia.

== Author and background ==
At the time of the book's publication, Richard McLean (born 1973) was an Australian graphic designer and illustrator. Allen & Unwin published Recovered, Not Cured in Australia in April 2003, and in the United States in May 2005. In May 2003, McLean worked for The Age, and played as a vocalist and a guitarist in a band. He was raised in Dandenong, Victoria.

== Synopsis ==
The book follows McLean through his conspiratorial delusions, drug use, friendships, traveling, prodromal phase, relationships, and career while living with schizophrenia. Interspersed throughout are McLean's artwork and messages about schizophrenia taken off of the Internet.

In his youth, McLean is a frequent user of marijuana. In high school, he remembers binge drinking and smoking at local nightclubs. Now in university studying art, he takes LSD, and looking back compares the effects of the drug to psychosis. McLean believes comic strips in the Herald Sun are sending him messages intended only for him.

Graduating university, he experiences thought transference, a symptom of schizophrenia. He begins a job at RACV as a storeman; thereat, McLean believes he receives a telephone call that says "we are following your every move", and a message over a PA system from a neighboring factory confirming the call. A voice outside of his home window says it will arrest him over sex crimes after he has drunken sex with a woman.

McLean thinks the radio is sending him cryptic messages, and gives a thumbs up to indicate he has received the message and that it is OK to send the next. He decides to travel overseas with a friend to get away from the conspiracy, though they do not leave for another few months. He confronts the manager of a factory next door responsible for the PA system, who says he does not know what McLean is talking about when he says he wants to get to the "bottom of this". McLean's mother wants him to see a doctor, but he refuses. He quits his job due to the conspiracy against him.

Taking the trip overseas, he and his friend arrive in Athens via flight. Now in London, he feels as though he is being followed; he takes the trip to avoid persecution, but it follows him. At SW1, a club in central London, he takes ecstasy, though later advises those in psychosis or inclined to psychosis to "tread very carefully" with the drug. McLean, who is bisexual, has a sexual encounter with an Englishman in the Cairngorms. He confesses his beliefs about the conspiracy to a woman from his hostel, who makes him promise he would get help once back in Australia. He breaks the promise once in his home country, and the illusory ideas return.

In chapter four, "[r]ealisations", McLean moves into a friend's house in Mordialloc, Victoria. His roommate recommends he get help for his delusions. He sees a doctor, telling him about knocks on a wall he believes are "conspirators letting [him] know that they knew [McLean] was there", but the doctor sends him away with no help. His friend asks him to move out due to the delusions, but allows him to stay if he seeks help. A psychologist refers him to a psychiatrist, who prescribes him Stelazine. He takes the medicine in its proper dosage after originally taking ten pills at once.

He says is "very lucky [he is] responsive to the medication, and the benefits outweigh the side effects". After several months taking the medicine, multiple symptoms go away, such as listening to the radio and hearing messages. In chapter seven, "[r]eflections", McLean offers his opinions on matters such as mental health and suicide and support networks. The book concludes with a list of Internet resources about mental health grouped by location.

== Reception ==
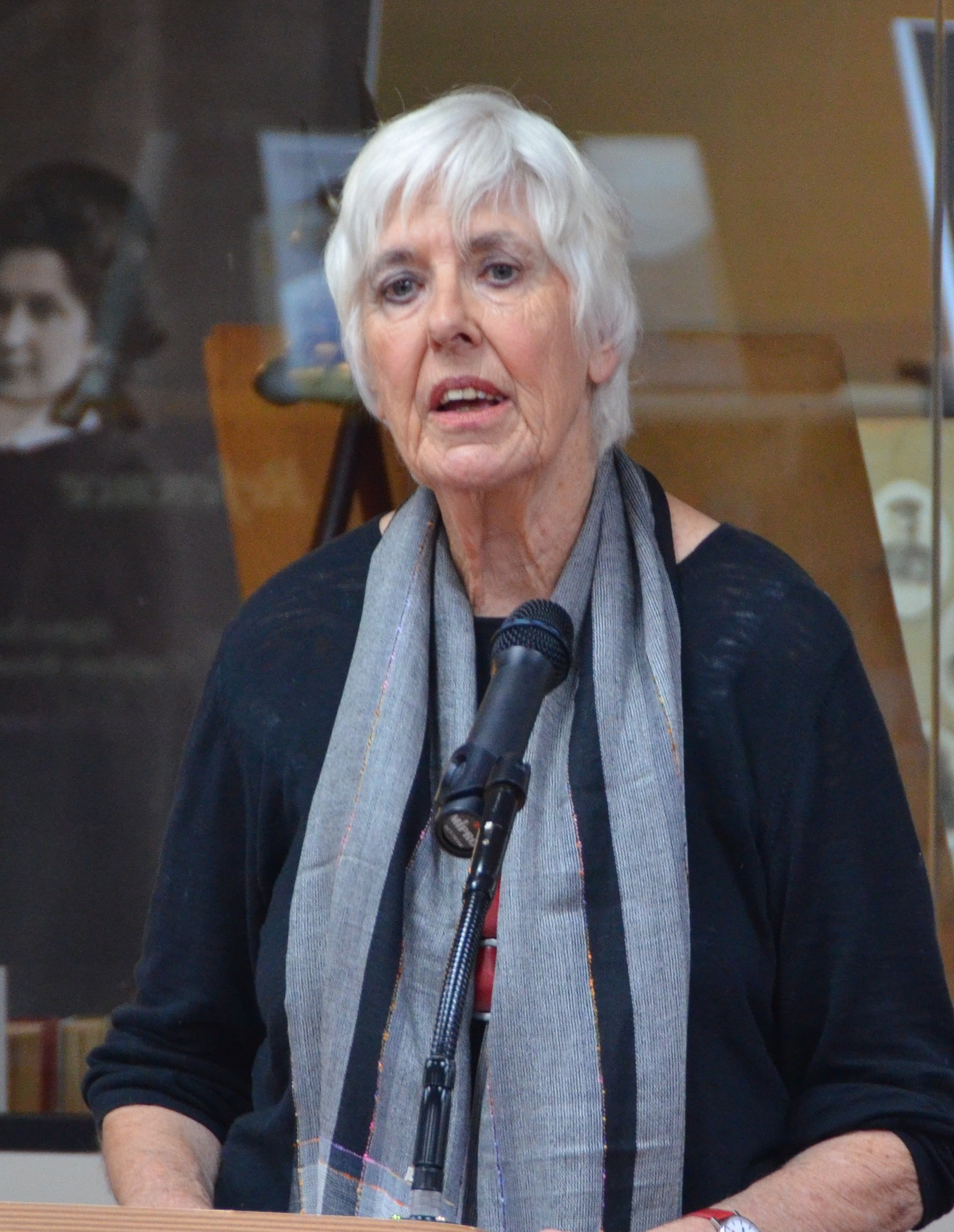
Anne Deveson (pictured) noted the place of Recovered, Not Cured in the evolution of mental health media.

The book received mostly positive reviews upon release. Kirkus Reviews described McLean's style as "uncompromisingly direct and matter-of-fact, with a wealth of detail that opens up the world of a schizophrenic's thoughts without romanticizing the experience". In Disability Studies Quarterly, Hannah Anderson called the book deeply personal. Donna Chavez of Booklist stated the book distills the essence of mental disease, with his illustrations taking the descriptions to another level, while Lewis A. Opler of JAMA called the first-person retelling brave and important as a counterview that the illness has an unchangeably negative course. In the Australian and New Zealand Journal of Psychiatry, Peter Keogh called the book useful for those who have experience with psychosis, whether as a carer, professional, or patient.

Anderson called the story broken. She stated McLean was blessed with support friends and family, "which can prevent repercussions such as living in a group home, being hospitalized, or even living on the streets". Therefore, she states the memoir overshadows several of the negative and commonplace results of living with schizophrenia. Lynne F. Maxwell of Library Journal described the author as fortunate for escaping schizophrenia more or less unharmed, and noted the constant support of family and friends in McLean's journey.

The book received a starred review in Reading Time. Writing in The Age, Nathaniel Lachenmeyer called Recovered, Not Cured a "coruscating account of what the disease can do to a fine, young mind", and a travelogue from a location to which one never wants to journey. Author Anne Deveson, in The Sydney Morning Herald, noted the place of the memoir in the evolution of mental health media, from the novel One Flew Over the Cuckoo's Nest challenging of institutionalization for treatment of mental illness to screenplays focusing on heroics, and described the memoir as more candid than previous writings.

== Post publication ==
After publication, Recovered, Not Cured received "Highly Commended" in the 2003 Human Rights Award Arts Non-fiction category, presented by the Australian Human Rights and Equal Opportunity Commission, and won 2004 Book of the Year from SANE Australia.

== See also ==
- List of memoirs about schizophrenia
