= John Read (psychologist) =

New Zealand psychologist and mental health researcher

John Read is a psychologist and mental health researcher from England. He is professor of clinical psychology in the University of East London's School of Psychology.

== Career ==
Read was formerly a clinical psychologist in the Department of Psychology at the University of Auckland. His research interests include: attitudes towards 'mental illness', psycho-social causes of psychosis, and the role of the pharmaceutical industry in psychology.

Before joining the university in 1994, Read worked for twenty years as a manager of mental health services, working with people experiencing psychosis. He is the Editor of the journal Psychosis and is on the editorial boards of two other journals. He is also on the executive board of the International Society for the Psychological Treatments of Schizophrenia. Read is the editor of Models of Madness: Psychological, Social and Biological Approaches to Schizophrenia (Routledge, 2004) which has sold over 10,000 copies and been translated into Chinese, Russian, Spanish and Swedish. In 2010 he received the New Zealand Psychological Society's Sir Thomas Hunter Award for 'excellence in scholarship, research and professional achievement'.

In 2010, Read and Richard Bentall co-authored a literature review on "The effectiveness of electroconvulsive therapy" (ECT). It examined placebo-controlled studies and concluded ECT had minimal benefits for people with depression and schizophrenia. The authors said "given the strong evidence of persistent and, for some, permanent brain dysfunction, primarily evidenced in the form of retrograde and anterograde amnesia, and the evidence of a slight but significant increased risk of death, the cost-benefit analysis for ECT is so poor that its use cannot be scientifically justified". Certain psychiatrists, however, sharply criticized this paper in passing by calling it an "evidence-poor paper with an anti-ECT agenda".

== Selected publications ==
- Read, John; Sanders, Pete (2010). A straight talking introduction to the causes of mental health problems. PCCS Books. ISBN 978-1906254193.
- Geekie, Jim; Read, John (2009). Making sense of madness: contesting the meaning of schizophrenia. Taylor & Francis. ISBN 978-0415461955.
- Varese, F; Smeets, F; Drukker, M; Lieverse, R; Lataster, T; Viechtbauer, W; Read, J; van Os, J; Bentall, RP (29 March 2012). "Childhood Adversities Increase the Risk of Psychosis: A Meta-analysis of Patient-Control, Prospective- and Cross-sectional Cohort Studies". Schizophrenia Bulletin. 38 (4): 661–71. doi:10.1093/schbul/sbs050. PMC 3406538. PMID 22461484.
- Read, John; Dillon, J; Lampshire, Deborah (2014). "How much evidence is required for a paradigm shift in mental health?". Acta Psychiatrica Scandinavica. 129 (6): 477–4782. doi:10.1111/acps.12216. PMID 24215794.
- Read, John; Cain, A (2013). "A literature review and meta-analysis of drug company funded mental health websites". Acta Psychiatrica Scandinavica. 128 (6): 422–433. doi:10.1111/acps.12146. PMID 23662697.
- Read, John (2010). "Can Poverty Drive You Mad? 'Schizophrenia', Socio-Economic Status and the Case for Primary Prevention". New Zealand Journal of Psychology. 39 (2): 7–19. Archived from the original on 8 February 2013.
- Read, J; Bentall, RP; Fosse, R (October–December 2009). "Time to abandon the bio-bio-bio model of psychosis: Exploring the epigenetic and psychological mechanisms by which adverse life events lead to psychotic symptoms". Epidemiologia e Psichiatria Sociale. 18 (4): 299–310. doi:10.1017/S1121189X00000257. PMID 20170043.
- Larkin, W; Read, J (2008). "Childhood trauma and psychosis: evidence, pathways, and implications". Journal of Postgraduate Medicine. 54 (4): 287–293. doi:10.4103/0022-3859.41437. hdl:1807/52216. PMID 18953148.
- Read, J; Haslam, N; Sayce, L; Davies, E (November 2006). "Prejudice and schizophrenia: a review of the 'mental illness is an illness like any other' approach" (PDF). Acta Psychiatrica Scandinavica. 114 (5): 303–318. doi:10.1111/j.1600-0447.2006.00824.x. PMID 17022790.
- Read, J; van Os, J; Morrison, AP; Ross, CA (November 2005). "Childhood trauma, psychosis and schizophrenia: a literature review with theoretical and clinical implications" (PDF). Acta Psychiatrica Scandinavica. 112 (5): 330–350. doi:10.1111/j.1600-0447.2005.00634.x. PMID 16223421. Archived from the original (PDF) on 9 May 2013.
- Read, John; Mosher, Loren; Bentall, Richard (2004). Models of madness: psychological, social and biological approaches to schizophrenia. Brunner-Routledge. ISBN 978-1583919064.
- The effectiveness of electroconvulsive therapy: a literature review.

== See also ==
- Richard Bentall
- Hearing Voices Network
- Index of psychology articles
- Loren Mosher
- Outline of psychology
- Psychosis (journal)
- Jim van Os
