= Mark Vonnegut =

American physician and writer (born 1947)

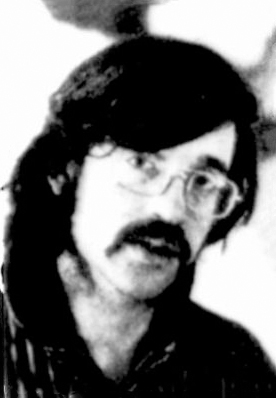
- Vonnegut, c. 1975
- Born: May 11, 1947 (age 79)
- Education: Swarthmore College (BA); Harvard University (MD)
- Occupations: Pediatrician, memoirist
- Spouse: Barbara Sibert (m. 1999)
- Children: 3
- Parent: Kurt Vonnegut (father)
- Relatives: Edith Vonnegut (sister); Steve Adams (cousin / adopted brother)
- Writing career
- Genre: Memoir
- Notable work: The Eden Express

Mark Vonnegut (born May 11, 1947) is an American pediatrician and author. He is the son of writer Kurt Vonnegut. He is the brother of Edith Vonnegut and Nanette Vonnegut. He described himself in the preface to his 1975 book as "a hippie, son of a counterculture hero, BA in religion, (with a) genetic disposition to schizophrenia."

== Education ==
Mark Vonnegut (whom his parents named after Mark Twain) graduated from Swarthmore College in 1969. He briefly worked at Duthie Books and was also briefly chief of a 20-man detachment of special state police that provided the security for Boston State Hospital. During the Vietnam War, he filed an application with the draft board to be considered a conscientious objector, which was denied. After taking the psychological examination, he was given a psychiatric 4-F classification and avoided conscription into the U.S. military.

During his undergraduate years, he set out to become a Unitarian minister. He eventually abandoned that goal.

== Writing ==
He is the author of The Eden Express (1975), which describes his trip to British Columbia to set up a commune with his friends and his personal experiences with schizophrenia, which at that time he attributed to stress, diet and, in part, drug use. During this period, he lived mainly at the commune at Powell Lake, located 18 kilometres by boat from the nearest road or electricity. The book is widely cited as useful for those coping with schizophrenia.

On February 14, 1971, he was diagnosed with severe schizophrenia and committed to Hollywood Hospital in Vancouver. Standard psychotherapy did not help him, and most of his doctors said his case was hopeless.

Vonnegut first attributed his recovery to orthomolecular megavitamin therapy and then wrote The Eden Express. In this book, he states that "approximately a third - improve without any treatment. Whatever shrink happens to be standing around when such remissions occur is usually willing to assume credit".

Vonnegut published an article in The New England Journal of Medicine, December 27, 2007, and has published several short pieces on pediatrics and other topics in The Boston Globe and The Patriot Ledger. He has served on the National Institute for Health Consensus Conference on ADHD since November 1999.

Vonnegut published his second book, Just Like Someone Without Mental Illness Only More So, in 2010. Like The Eden Express, it is autobiographical. His third book, The Heart of Caring: A Life in Pediatrics, was published in 2022.

== Medical career ==
After the publication of his first book, Vonnegut studied medicine at Harvard Medical School and later came to the conclusion that he actually had bipolar disorder. Vonnegut graduated from Harvard Medical School in 1979. After graduation, Vonnegut completed a pediatric Internship and Residency at Massachusetts General Hospital.

He has practiced pediatrics for over 40 years, opening his own practice, M.V. Pediatrics, in 2001. He was formerly a pediatrician in Quincy, Massachusetts, until his retirement in mid-2023.

== Personal life ==
Vonnegut has been married twice and has three children. He first married in 1975 and had two sons - that marriage ended in divorce. In 1999, he married Barbara Sibert. Together, they have one son.
