= Rae Unzicker =

American activist (1948–2001)

Rae Unzicker (born Carole Renetta Engles August 20, 1948 – March 22, 2001) was a civil rights activist and advocate for the rights of persons with psychiatric disabilities.

== Biography ==
Unzicker was born in 1948, and grew up in Kansas. She suffered from a psychiatric disorder, which lead her parents to send her to many hospitals during her childhood years. She attended University of Kansas in 1966–1967, despite suffering a hospitalization during that year.

In 1979 she founded the South Dakota Mental Health Advocacy Project to work on the rights of psychiatric patients and persons with psychiatric conditions. This project would be published to inform the public of the struggles arising for people with psychiatric disabilities. The project also provides education and support for those people in need. Some other purposes for the project are to advocate for better funding, improve public opinion of disabled people, and to provide comfort and support to the families of people with psychiatric disabilities.

== Awards and recognition ==
- Outstanding Woman in America, 1987, Women's Day Magazine
- Appointed by Bill Clinton to National Council on Disability, 1995
