= Robert K. Rasmussen =

American legal scholar

- Education: Loyola University Chicago (B.A.); University of Chicago Law School (J.D.)
- Organization: USC Gould School of Law
- Known for: Bankruptcy law

Robert K. Rasmussen is an American legal scholar who is currently the J. Thomas McCarthy Trustee Chair in Law and Political Science at the USC Gould School of Law, where he served as Dean from 2007 to 2015. He is a prominent scholar of bankruptcy law.

== Education and career ==
Rasmussen graduated from Loyola University Chicago with a B.A. summa cum laude in 1982, majoring in political science. In 1985, he graduated with a J.D. with honors from the University of Chicago Law School, where he was a member of the Order of the Coif.

After graduating from law school, Rasmussen served as a law clerk to Judge John Cooper Godbold on the United States Court of Appeals for the Fifth Circuit. Between 1986 and 1989, he worked as a member of the appellate staff in the civil division of the United States Department of Justice. In 1989, he joined the faculty of Vanderbilt University Law School, where he remained for 18 years. During that period, he served as a visiting professor at the University of Chicago Law School and the University of Michigan Law School.

Rasmussen is recognised as a leading figure in bankruptcy law. He is a member of the American College of Bankruptcy and has published numerous articles on bankruptcy law and related areas. He has authored several amicus curiae briefs in the Supreme Court of the United States on appeals involving questions of bankruptcy law.
