= Liverpool University Neuroleptic Side-Effect Rating Scale =

LUNSERS refers to the Liverpool University Neuroleptic Side Effect Rating Scale.

== Overview ==
Within the field of psychiatry, many simple and complex tools exist for the rating of such things as severity of illness and problems associated with the use of medications, for treating mental illness. The medications used to treat mental illness—particularly psychotic disorders—are referred to as anti-psychotics or neuroleptics. Both phrases, although generally used interchangeably, are not actually the same.

The LUNSERS is designed to monitor medication-induced side effects. This psychiatric assessment tools allows for the monitoring of side effects related to neuroleptic (or anti-psychotic) medications. The test is a self-reported check-tick box format with a predefined scale from "not at all" to "very much". The test asks 51 questions in all with a number being red herrings to test for people over-rating themselves. It has been proposed that this is useful for spotting malingerers and hypochondriacs, however its intention in the original research proposal for LUNSERS was to demonstrate the robustness and reliability of self-reporting.

There are seven subcategories in the overall results:

- Extrapyramidal – parkinsonian type side effects.
- Autonomic – related to uncontrollable side effects.
- Psychic – relating to the functioning of mind and emotion.
- Miscellaneous/various – known side effects without category.
- Anticholinergic – side-effects impacting the choline system.
- Allergic reaction.
- Prolactin – many neuroleptics affect hormones particularly prolactin.

As well as,

- Red herrings – designed to trap people who over-rate symptoms.
