= The Daily Item (Lynn) =

Daily newspaper in Massachusetts, US

- Type: Daily newspaper
- Format: Broadsheet
- Owner: Essex Media Group
- Founded: 1876, as Lynn City Item
- Headquarters: 85 Exchange St., Lynn, Massachusetts 01901 United States
- Circulation: 16,100 Daily (as of 2007)
- Website: itemlive.com

The Daily Item is a six-day (Monday through Saturday) morning daily newspaper published in Lynn, Massachusetts, United States. In addition to its home city, The Daily Item covers the Massachusetts North Shore cities and towns of Nahant, Saugus, Swampscott, Peabody, Lynnfield, Marblehead, and circulates in several adjacent towns.

== History ==
The Item's history dates back to Horace N. Hastings, who, along with three of his four sons, first published the paper on Dec. 8, 1877. Their stated mission was to publish "a daily newspaper of the caliber to meet the needs of the people and to aid in the progress and prosperity of [the] growing city" of Lynn.

The newspaper remained in the control of the Hastings and Gamage families for five generations until the sale to Essex Media Group.

== Competition ==
By 1996, the Daily Evening Item was the last family-owned newspaper on the North Shore, its chief competitor, The Salem Evening News, having been bought the year before by Essex County Newspapers, part of the Ottaway division of Dow Jones & Company, which already published four other dailies up the coast. Item Publisher Brian Thayer told employees the paper was "fac[ing] bankruptcy or failure".

The Gamage family hired a new publisher, B.J. Frazier, and cut employee wages. Four years later, Frazier changed the paper's name to The Daily Item, introduced a morning edition and announced an agreement with Essex County Newspapers to print the Lynn paper on their presses. The Daily Item circulation at the time was little over 20,000.

Contrary to reports in 1996 that the newspaper might be sold, possibly to Essex County Newspapers, Frazier in 2000 said the Beverly-based publisher would be treated as "a commercial printing company", not "a potential merger. ... The Daily Item is going to remain fully independent."

== Sale by Hastings-Gamage family ==
In September 2014, Hastings & Sons Publishing Co. Inc., sold The Daily Item to Essex Media Group, a local investment group led by Communications Consulting Group principal and former Item editor Ted Grant. According to publisher Peter Hastings Gamage, the sale was required to meet the company's pension obligations. The sale ended 137 years of ownership by the Hastings family.

== Prices ==
The Daily Item prices are: $2 Monday-Saturday.
