= Richard McLean (Australia) =

- Born: 1973 (age 52–53)
- Occupations: Illustrator, writer, musician, artist
- Instruments: Guitar, vocals
- Member of: Bravura, Less, Welcome to Tuesday

Richard McLean (born 1973) is an Australian illustrator, writer, musician, and artist. He works as a graphic artist and illustrator for the Melbourne-based newspaper, The Age. He has schizophrenia, the experience of which he often incorporates into his art. He often refers to himself as Richie Mclean to differentiate himself from the American artist of the same name.

== Bibliography ==
- A Certain Beauty In Un-Resolution... ART; ISBN 9781388236373
- Recovered, Not Cured: A Journey Through Schizophrenia ISBN 1-86508-974-5 reviews:
- Strange Currencies of Ego and Soul, the visual language of Richard McLean ISBN 978-0-9805016-0-5
- "The SHRINK ...and you thought you were crazy" ISBN 978-0980501674
- "Back to Basics; 50 Recent Drawings" ISBN 9781497577565
- "Grogan the Monster in...What do you Love?" ISBN 978-1499109924
