= The Eden Express =

1975 book by Mark Vonnegut

- Author: Mark Vonnegut
- Genre: Memoir
- Publisher: Praeger Publishing
- Publication date: 1975
- ISBN: 1-58322-543-9

The Eden Express: A Memoir of Insanity (ISBN 1-58322-543-9) is a 1975 memoir by Mark Vonnegut, son of American writer Kurt Vonnegut, about Mark's experiences in the late 1960s and his major psychotic breakdown and recovery. After his recovery, he undertook the study of medicine and orthomolecular medicine, although he later disavowed the latter.

The foreword was written by Kurt Vonnegut, who said, "his [Mark Vonnegut's] wish is to tell people who are going insane something about the shape of the roller coaster they are on."

The Eden Express is an autobiographical account of Mark's years immediately after college, his thoughts, experiences and descent into and eventual emergence from mental illness. It starts with the words, "June 1969: Swarthmore Graduation. The night before, someone had taken white paint and painted "Commence What?" on the front of the stage." It continues with an account of his journey in a VW Bug to the wilds of British Columbia to build a commune with his girlfriend and college friends. The book continues until two years later, on Valentine's Day, 1971, Vonnegut had suffered from a psychotic episode and was committed to Woodlands Psychiatric Hospital in New Westminster, about 10 days after taking mescaline, which left him unable to sleep and uninterested in eating. He was diagnosed as having paranoid schizophrenia.

The New York Times describes the book as:

Mark Vonnegut’s depiction of his descent into, and eventual emergence from, mental illness. As a recent college graduate, self-avowed hippie, and son of a counterculture hero, Vonnegut begins to experience increasingly delusional thinking, suicidal thoughts, and physical incapacity. In February 1971 he is committed to a psychiatric hospital... (an) honest, thoughtful, and moving account of the illness of schizophrenia. Required reading for those who want to understand insanity from the inside.

The book was translated into Swedish as Express till paradiset. It was also translated into Polish as Eden express (transl. Sherill Howard Pociecha i Lech Janerka, Wrocław/Breslau 1992) and into German as Eden Express - Die Geschichte meines Wahnsinns (transl. Johann Christoph Maass), Berlin 2014.
