= USC Gould School of Law =

Private law school in Los Angeles, California

Coordinates: 34°01′05″N 118°17′01″W

University of Southern California Gould School of Law
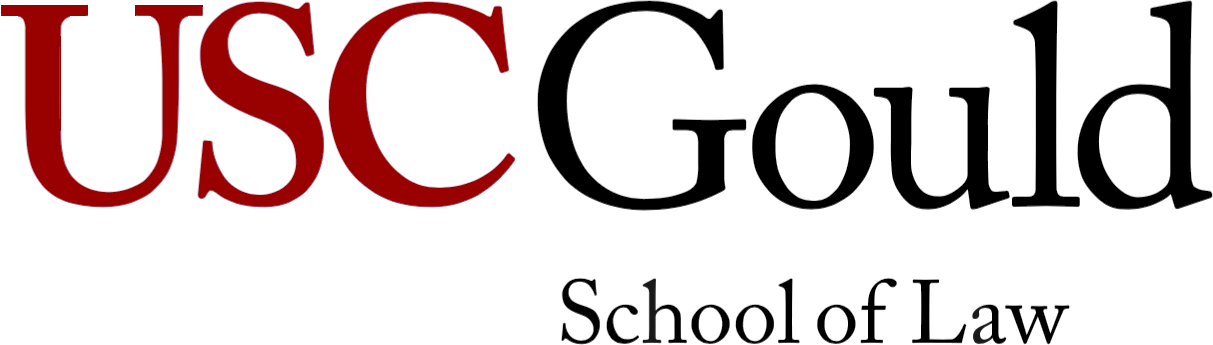
- Motto: Palmam qui meruit ferat (Latin); He who deserves the palm should bear it
- Parent school: University of Southern California
- Established: 1900
- School type: Private
- Dean: Franita Tolson
- Location: Los Angeles, California, United States
- Enrollment: 644
- Faculty: 59 (full-time); 127 (part-time)
- USNWR ranking: 26th (tie) (2025)
- Bar pass rate: 82.42% (2023 1st time takers)
- Website: gould.usc.edu
- ABA profile: Standard 509 Report

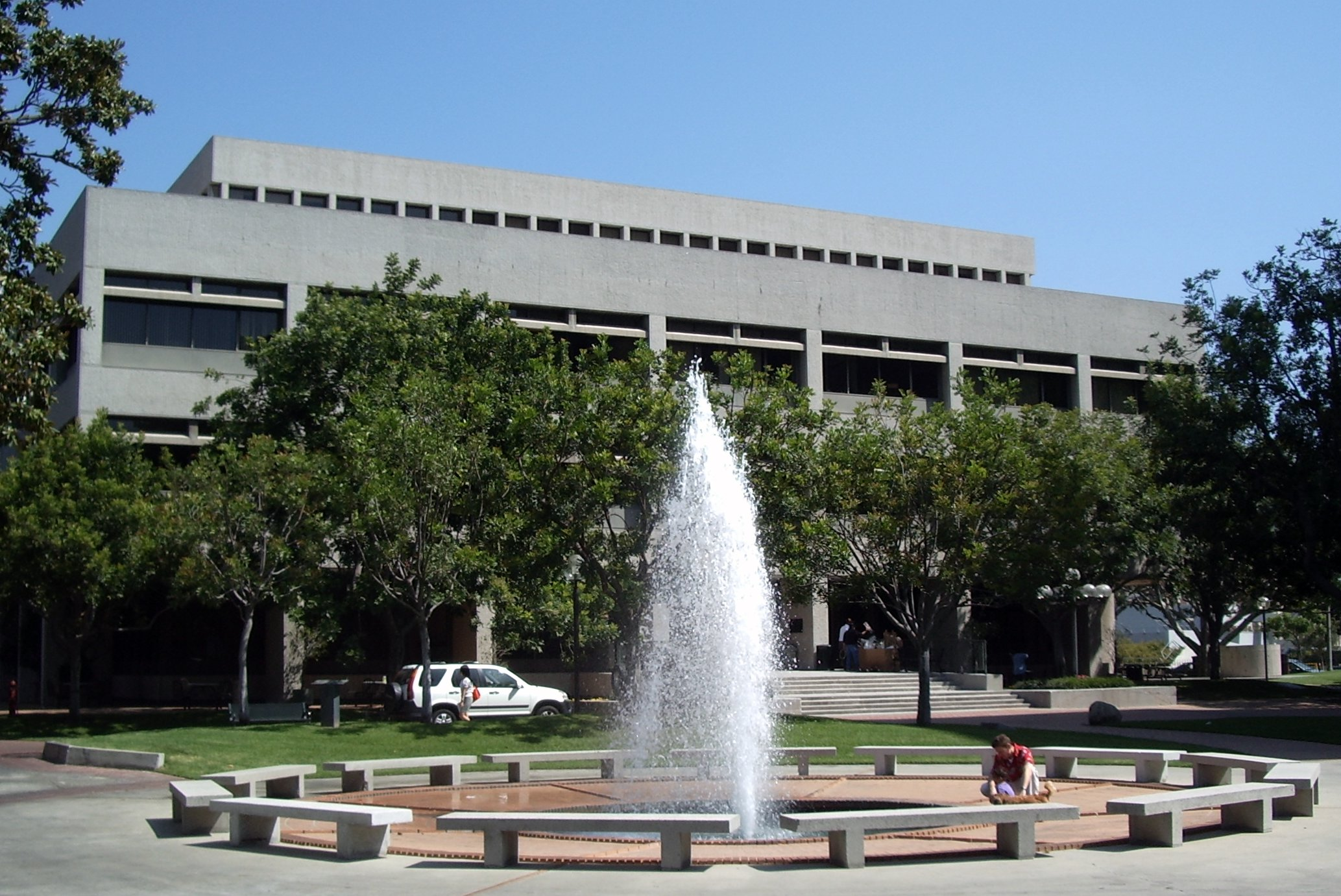
USC Law School

The University of Southern California Gould School of Law located in Los Angeles, California, is the law school of the University of Southern California. The oldest law school in the Southwestern United States, USC Law traces its beginnings to 1896 and became affiliated with USC in 1900. It was named in honor of Judge James Gould in the mid-1960s.

== History ==
On March 12, 1890, the Los Angeles Times declared in an editorial: "It is time that a law school should be established in Los Angeles." During the 1890s, there were several false starts at founding the first law school in Southern California. At its founding in 1891, Throop University (better known today as the California Institute of Technology) announced its intent to include a college of law among its various planned components, but never actually started one. The Southern California College of Law was founded in 1892 and operated until 1894.

In the absence of a formal law school, young men interested in careers in law (female lawyers were extremely rare at the time) formed several law student associations over the years which organized lectures by local attorneys as well as quiz sessions in which the students orally quizzed each other or were quizzed by an attorney. At the time, the term "law student" simply meant anyone who was actively studying law, either in an attorney's office, or by correspondence, or on their own. Law student associations were tiny, informal, fluid, and unstable, since individual students' level of interest in helping to run the associations tended to evaporate once they became members of the California bar and needed to focus on the actual practice of law. The common objective of students participating in such associations was to develop an understanding of California law strong enough to survive the bar examination of that era: oral cross-examination on various legal subjects by the members of the Supreme Court of California.

USC Gould School of Law was born out of one of these associations. On the evening of November 17, 1896, 36 law students gathered in the courtroom of Judge David C. Morrison to form the Law Students' Association of Los Angeles. They selected James B. Scott as the first preceptor (equivalent to a modern instructor). An informal course of instruction began two weeks later in Judge Morrison's courtroom. The students of the Association recognized that a more permanent arrangement was needed, and on June 12, 1897, the Los Angeles Law School was incorporated. Its first formal lecture was held at 7:30 p.m. on September 13, 1897. As head of the new law school, Scott preferred the new interactive style of teaching law pioneered by Christopher Columbus Langdell at Harvard Law School: the casebook method combined with the Socratic method.

In 1899, Scott became dean of the University of Illinois College of Law. The Los Angeles Law School became affiliated with USC in 1900, and on June 6, 1901, its first class of seven graduates received their Bachelor of Laws degrees at USC's commencement exercises. Without Scott around to enforce the Harvard method, the Los Angeles Law School collapsed that same year amidst bickering over pedagogical methods; some of the instructors preferred to teach law through the traditional lecture method in which students were expected to be much more passive. Several instructors who preferred the Harvard method immediately organized the Los Angeles College of Law, which was officially launched on September 30, 1901 with a new board of trustees, a different address, and 10 students. Although the two law schools were entirely distinct legal entities, the students of the old law school regarded the new law school as a continuation of their program and immediately enrolled in the new one. In 1904, USC took over the Los Angeles College of Law, then set about acquiring the remaining assets of the now-dormant Los Angeles Law School (namely, a law library and $200 in cash), which took two more years.

USC Law joined the Association of American Law Schools (AALS) in 1907. It has been an American Bar Association (ABA) approved law school since 1924.

By the mid-1940s, young people in Southern California who wished to obtain a high-quality legal education faced a difficult choice: they had to find some way to pay the USC School of Law's expensive tuition, settle for a lesser program, or move north to attend the state's existing public law schools at Berkeley Law or Hastings. The California State Legislature responded to this problem in 1947 by creating the first public law school in the Southland (and USC's crosstown rival): the UCLA School of Law. UCLA Law graduate Dorothy Wright Nelson served as dean of USC Law from 1969 to 1980, before becoming a judge on the United States Court of Appeals for the Ninth Circuit.

2002 saw the beginning of the USC Law Graduate and International Programs.

== Admissions ==
For the class entering in 2023, the school accepted 607 applicants (12.52%), with 178 of those accepted enrolling, a 29.32% yield rate. Eleven students were not included in the acceptance statistics. The class consists of 189 students. The median LSAT score was 169 and the median undergraduate GPA was 3.88. Ten students were not included in the LSAT calculation and four not included in the GPA calculation. Its 25th/75th percentile LSAT scores and GPA were 165/169 and 3.77/3.96.

== Academics ==
USC Gould awards the J.D., LL.M., and M.C.L. law degrees. It currently has about 600 J.D. students (200 per year) and a graduate program of about 200 LL.M. and M.C.L. students. It offers three certificate programs: business law, entertainment law, and alternative dispute resolution.

=== Rankings ===
In 2025, USC Gould was ranked tied for 26th by the U.S. News & World Report list of "America's Best Graduate Schools".

=== Academic journals and honors programs ===
USC Gould hosts three academic journals and offers one additional honors program: Southern California Law Review, Southern California Review of Law and Social Justice (formerly the Review of Law and Women's Studies), Interdisciplinary Law Journal, and the Hale Moot Court Honors Program. Selected law students can participate in one honors program in an academic year.

The school has a chapter of the Order of the Coif, a national law school honorary society.

=== Clinical programs ===
USC Gould maintains six client clinics to provide students experience with lawyering skills.

- International Human Rights Clinic – research and drafting in cases trying perpetrators of war crimes, crimes against humanity, genocide and terrorism; representing survivors of human trafficking and domestic violence
- Immigration Clinic – pro bono representation to clients in a variety of immigration cases from over 25 different countries
- Intellectual Property and Technology Law Clinic – assisting artists, entrepreneurs, non-profit organizations, and policymakers with intellectual property issues
- Mediation Clinic – mediation for small claims and civil harassment cases for the Los Angeles County Superior Court
- Post-Conviction Justice Project – representing clients on civil issues related to incarceration, parole hearings, and constitutional rights
- Small Business Clinic – corporate legal assistance to entrepreneurs, non-profit organizations, and small businesses

=== Study abroad program ===
USC Gould offers international study abroad programs, providing credit to J.D. students. Students may spend a semester abroad at the University of Hong Kong Faculty of Law, Bocconi University, Jean Moulin University Lyon 3, Bond University and Fundação Getúlio Vargas. Previously, students could pursue a J.D./LL.M dual degree with the London School of Economics.

=== Dual Degree programs ===
USC Gould maintains dual degree programs with the Marshall School of Business, the Dornsife College of Letters, Arts and Sciences, the Price School of Public Policy, the School of Social Work, the Davis School of Gerontology, and the Annenberg School of Communication. Dual degree programs are accelerated. If the non-law master's degree normally requires one year of study, a student in a dual degree program earns both degrees in only three years. If the master's degree normally requires two years, a total of four years is necessary.

USC Gould also maintains two other dual degree programs. A program with the California Institute of Technology enables a student to receive a J.D. from USC and a Ph.D. in social science from Caltech. A dual degree program with the USC School of Pharmacy enables a qualified student to earn a J.D. and a Pharm.D. degree.

== Bar examination passage ==
In 2023, the overall bar examination passage rate for the law school's first-time examination takers was 82.42%. The Ultimate Bar Pass Rate, which the ABA defines as the passage rate for graduates who sat for bar examinations within two years of graduating, was 97.87% for the class of 2021.

== Employment ==
According to the USC Gould School of Law's official 2014 ABA-required disclosures, 79.3% of the Class of 2014 obtained full-time, long-term, JD-required employment (i.e. as attorneys) nine months after graduation. USC Gould's Law School Transparency under-employment score is 8.8%, indicating the percentage of the Class of 2014 unemployed, pursuing an additional degree, or working in a non-professional, short-term, or part-time job nine months after graduation.

== Costs ==
The total cost of attendance (indicating the cost of tuition, fees, and living expenses) at USC Gould for the 2024-2025 academic year is $109,558 if living on campus and $110,368 if living off campus. The Law School Transparency estimated cost for three years at USC Gould is $414,611.

== Deans ==
1. 1896-1899, James Brown Scott
2. 1904–1927, Frank M. Porter
3. 1927–1930, Justin Miller
4. 1930–1948, William G. Hale
5. 1948–1952, Shelden Elliott
6. 1952–1963, Robert Kingsley
7. 1963–1968, Orrin B. Evans
8. 1968–1980, Dorothy W. Nelson
9. 1980–2000, Scott H. Bice
10. 2000–2006, Matthew L. Spitzer
11. 2006–2007, Edward J. McCaffery (interim)
12. 2007–2015, Robert K. Rasmussen
13. 2015–2023, Andrew T. Guzman
14. 2024-present, Franita Tolson

== Faculty ==
- Jody Armour – specializes in race issues; author of Negrophobia and Reasonable Racism
- Susan Estrich – Professor of Law and Political Science. A Fox News commentator, author of The Case for Hillary Clinton, 2005, and Soulless: The Right Wing Church of Hate, 2006. First woman editor in chief of the Harvard Law Review; youngest woman to receive tenure from Harvard Law School (before leaving to teach at USC)).
- Orin Kerr nationally recognized scholar of criminal procedure and computer crime law
- Elyn Saks founder and director of Saks Institute for Mental Health Law, Policy, and Ethics; author of The Center Cannot Hold: My Journey Through Madness

=== Former faculty ===
- Elizabeth Garrett – first woman president of Cornell University, USC vice president of academic planning and budget, professor of law, political science and public policy
- Erwin Chemerinsky – former Sydney M. Irmas Professor of Public Interest Law, Legal Ethics, and Political Science, 1983–2004; former professor at the Duke University School of Law; founding dean at the University of California, Irvine School of Law; current dean at University of California, Berkeley, School of Law
- Richard Epstein – known for his arguments against anti-discrimination laws; currently the Laurence A. Tisch Professor of Law and director of the Classical Liberal Institute at New York University; previously the James Parker Hall Distinguished Service Professor of Law at the University of Chicago Law School
- James Brown Scott – authority on international law, founding dean of USC Law School
- Charles Whitebread – expert on Criminal Procedure and lecturer for BarBri; author of The Eight Secrets of Top Exam Performance in Law School
- Debra Wong Yang – trial advocacy expert; the first Asian American woman served as a United States Attorney
- Carole E. Handler – Professor of antitrust and intellectual property law
