= Psychosis (journal) =

- Discipline: Psychiatry, psychology
- Language: English
- Edited by: John Read

Publication details
- History: 2009–present
- Publisher: Routledge
- Frequency: Quarterly
- Impact factor: 1.213 (2018)

Standard abbreviations
- ISO 4: Psychosis

Indexing
- ISSN: 1752-2439 (print); 1752-2447 (web)
- LCCN: 2007213157
- OCLC no.: 153927002

Links
- Journal homepage; Online access; Online archives; Journal page at society's website

Psychosis: Psychological, Social and Integrative Approaches is a quarterly peer-reviewed medical journal published by Routledge covering research on the psychological treatments of psychosis (e.g. cognitive-behavior therapy, psychodynamic therapy, family therapy etc.) and the psycho-social causes of psychosis (e.g. poverty, drug abuse, child abuse and neglect, distressed families, urban living, discrimination, rape, war combat etc.). It is an official journal of the International Society for the Psychological and Social Approaches to Psychosis and was established in 2009. The editor-in-chief is John Read (University of East London). The journal contains original research, systematic reviews, commentaries on contentious articles, short reports, first-persons accounts, a book review section, and a correspondence column. The journal publishes papers on both quantitative research (e.g., rigorously designed outcome studies and epidemiological surveys) and qualitative research (e.g., case studies of therapy, first-person accounts of psychosis, and experiences of people with psychosis in the mental health system), as well as papers focusing on conceptual and ethical issues.

== Abstracting and indexing ==
The journal is abstracted and indexed in:

- Current Contents/Social & Behavioral Sciences
- EBSCO databases
- PsycINFO
- Scopus
- Social Sciences Citation Index

According to the Journal Citation Reports, the journal has a 2018 impact factor of 1.213.

== See also ==
- List of psychiatry journals
- List of psychology journals
