= Psychiatric Rehabilitation Journal =

- Discipline: Psychiatric rehabilitation
- Language: English
- Edited by: Sandra G. Resnick

Publication details
- Former name(s): Psychosocial Rehabilitation Journal
- History: 2002-present
- Publisher: American Psychological Association (United States)
- Frequency: Quarterly
- Impact factor: 1.935 (2020)

Standard abbreviations
- ISO 4: Psychiatr. Rehabil. J.

Indexing
- ISSN: 1095-158X (print); 1559-3126 (web)

Links
- Journal homepage; Online access

Psychiatric Rehabilitation Journal is a peer-reviewed medical journal published by the American Psychological Association. It was established in 1978 and covers research on the topics of "rehabilitation, psychosocial treatment, and recovery of people with serious mental illnesses". The current editor-in-chief is Sandra G. Resnick (Yale University).

== Abstracting and indexing ==
The journal is abstracted and indexed by MEDLINE/PubMed and the Social Sciences Citation Index. According to the Journal Citation Reports, the journal has a 2020 impact factor of 1.935.
