= Psychiatric Services =

- Discipline: Psychiatry
- Language: English
- Edited by: Lisa B. Dixon

Publication details
- Former name: A.P.A. Mental Hospital Service Bulletin
- History: 1950-present
- Publisher: American Psychiatric Association (United States)
- Frequency: Monthly
- Impact factor: 4.157 (2021)

Standard abbreviations
- ISO 4: Psychiatr. Serv.

Indexing
- ISSN: 1075-2730 (print); 1557-9700 (web)
- LCCN: 97648020
- OCLC no.: 609457664

Links
- Journal homepage; Online access

Psychiatric Services is a monthly peer-reviewed medical journal covering research on psychiatry. It is published by the American Psychiatric Association and the editor-in-chief is Lisa Dixon.

The journal was established in 1950 by Daniel Blain as the A.P.A. Mental Hospital Service Bulletin.

The journal is abstracted and indexed in Medline/PubMed, the Science Citation Index Expanded, and Scopus. According to the Journal Citation Reports, the journal has a 2021 impact factor of 4.157.
