= BFM =

BFM may refer to:

== Broadcasting ==
- bFM, a station in the Student Radio Network in New Zealand
- BFM 89.9, a Malaysian radio station
- BFM Business, a French business news radio station
- BFM TV, a French rolling news TV channel
- Bailrigg FM, a Student Radio station located in Lancaster University

== Science ==
- Background field method, a procedure to calculate the effective action of a quantum field theory
- Bacterial flagellar motor of a cell flagellum
- Bond fluctuation model, a model for simulating polymer systems

== Other ==
- Bahrain Freedom Movement, a group opposing the Bahraini government
- Baitul Futuh Mosque, London
- Baltic Film and Media School, Estonia
- Baptist Faith and Message, a statement of faith by the Southern Baptists in the United States
- Basic fighter maneuvers for fighter aircraft
- Better Futures Minnesota, a social enterprise based in Minneapolis
- Bill Murray, an American actor
- Bonded Fibre Matrix, hydroseeding mulch used for erosion control
- Brasserie des Franches-Montagnes, a Swiss brewery
- Brave Fencer Musashi, a role-playing game
- Bund für Menschenrecht, a 1920s German gay rights organisation
- Bus Functional Model, a software model of an integrated circuit component
- Mobile Downtown Airport (IATA airport code), in Mobile, Alabama
- Blood Family Mafia, a Canadian street gang.
- BFM, a song by asteria, kets4eki, and Britney Manson, 2024
