= TVM =

TVM stands for:

== Television stations ==
- Televiziona Malagasy
- Television Malta
- Television Maldives
- Television of Mauritania
- TVMonaco
- Televisão de Moçambique

== Arts and entertainment ==
- Doctor Who (film), referred to by fans as the "TV movie"
- "TVM", a song by Tiziano Ferro from the 2011 album L'amore è una cosa semplice
- TVM, a parody of MTV in Degrassi
- The Vagina Monologues, a 1996 play by Eve Ensler

== Businesses and organisations ==
- TVM Comics, a publisher in Vietnam
- TVM (insurance), a Dutch insurance company
- Taiwan Video and Monitor Corporation, manufacturer of computer monitor

== Transportation ==
- Transmission voie-machine, a train control system
- Trans-Val-de-Marne, a bus rapid transit line in France

== Other uses ==
- Ticket vending machine, or ticket machine
- Time value of money, net value of cash flows at different points in time
- Time-varying microscale model, for high-resolution mapping
- Track-via-missile, a missile guidance technique
- Transaction verification model, or Bus functional model, a software model of an integrated circuit component
- Trophée Ville de Monaco, football tournament in Monaco

== See also ==
- Thiruvananthapuram, formerly known as Trivandrum, capital city of the Indian state of Kerala
