= Clinical psychology =

Branch of medicine focused on mental disorders

Clinical psychology is an integration of human science, behavioral science, theory, and clinical knowledge aimed at understanding, preventing, and relieving psychological distress or dysfunction as well as promoting well-being and personal growth. Central to its practice are psychological assessment, diagnosis, clinical formulation, and psychotherapy; although clinical psychologists also engage in research, teaching, consultation, forensic testimony, and program development and administration. In many countries, clinical psychology is a regulated mental health profession. In the United States, clinical psychologists operate under the same license as counseling psychologists and school psychologists.

The field is generally considered to have begun in 1896 with the opening of the first psychological clinic at the University of Pennsylvania by Lightner Witmer. In the first half of the 20th century, clinical psychology was focused on psychological assessment, with little attention given to treatment. This changed after the 1940s when World War II resulted in the need for a large increase in the number of trained clinicians. Since that time, three main educational models have developed in the US—the PhD Clinical Science model (heavily focused on research), the PhD science-practitioner model (integrating scientific research and practice), and the PsyD practitioner-scholar model (focusing on clinical theory and practice). In the UK and Ireland, the Clinical Psychology Doctorate falls between the latter two of these models, whilst in much of mainland Europe, the training is at the master's level and predominantly psychotherapist. Clinical psychologists are expert in providing psychotherapy, and generally train within four primary theoretical orientations—psychodynamic, humanistic, cognitive behavioral therapy (CBT), and systems or family therapy.

Clinical psychology is different from psychiatry. Although practitioners in both fields are experts in mental health, clinical psychologists are experts in psychological assessment, including neuropsychological and psychometric assessment, and they treat mental disorders primarily through psychotherapy. Currently, there are nine US states (Louisiana, New Mexico, Illinois, Iowa, Idaho, Colorado, Utah, Vermont, and, most recently, Hawaii) which allow clinical psychologists with advanced specialty training to prescribe psychotropic medications. Psychiatrists are medical doctors who specialize in the treatment of mental disorders via a variety of methods, including diagnostic assessment, psychotherapy, psychoactive medications, and medical procedures such as electroconvulsive therapy (ECT) or transcranial magnetic stimulation (TMS). Psychiatrists do not as standard have advanced training in psychometrics or psychotherapy equivalent to that of Clinical Psychologists.

== History ==
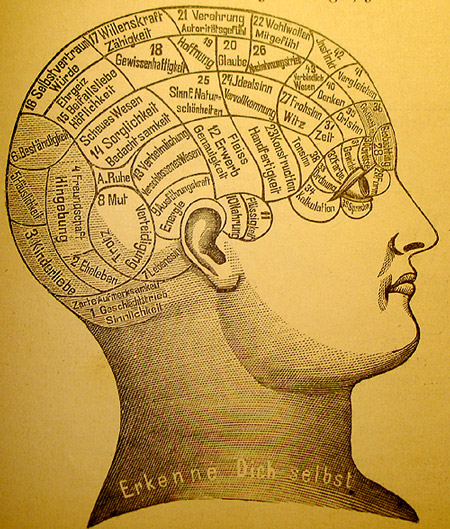
Many 18th century treatments for psychological distress were based on pseudo-scientific ideas, such as Phrenology.

The earliest recorded approaches to assess and treat mental distress were a combination of religious, magical, or medical perspectives. In the early 19th century, one approach to study mental conditions and behavior was using phrenology, the study of personality by examining the shape of the skull. Other popular treatments at that time included the study of the shape of the face (physiognomy) and Mesmer's treatment for mental conditions using magnets (mesmerism). Spiritualism and Phineas Quimby's "mental healing" were also popular.

While the scientific community eventually came to reject all of these methods for treating mental illness, academic psychologists also were not concerned with serious forms of mental illness. The study of mental illness was already being done in the developing fields of psychiatry and neurology within the asylum movement. It was not until the end of the 19th century, around the time when Sigmund Freud was first developing his "talking cure" in Vienna, that the first scientific application of clinical psychology began.

=== Early clinical psychology ===
Cover of The Psychological Clinic, the first journal of clinical psychology, published in 1907 by Lightner Witmer

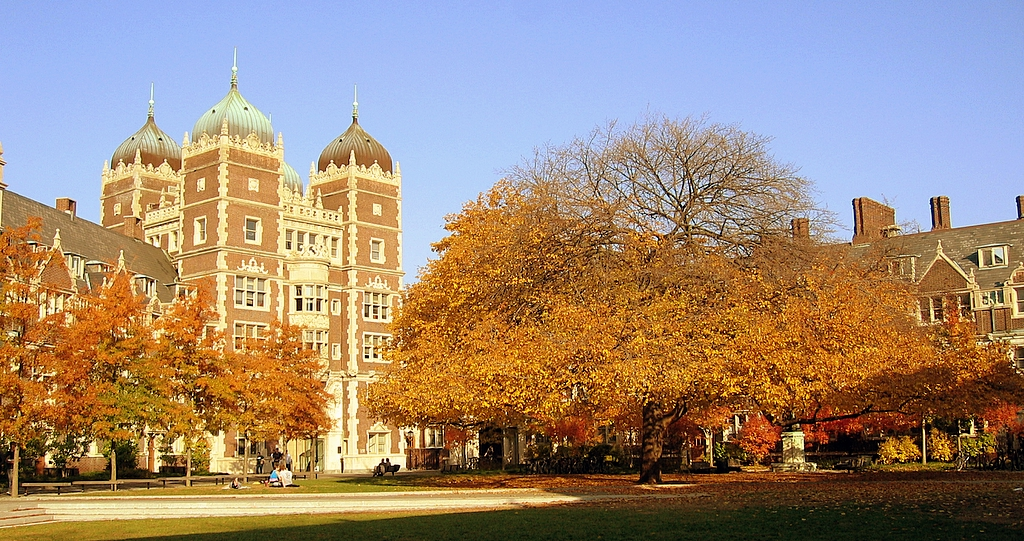
The University of Pennsylvania was the first to offer formal education in clinical psychology.

By the second half of the 1800s, the scientific study of psychology was becoming well established in university laboratories. Although there were a few scattered voices calling for applied psychology, the general field looked down upon this idea and insisted on "pure" science as the only respectable practice. This changed when Lightner Witmer (1867–1956), a past student of Wundt and head of the psychology department at the University of Pennsylvania, agreed to treat a young boy who had trouble with spelling. His successful treatment was soon to lead to Witmer's opening of the first psychological clinic at Penn in 1896, dedicated to helping children with learning disabilities. Ten years later in 1907, Witmer was to found the first journal of this new field, The Psychological Clinic, where he coined the term "clinical psychology", defined as "the study of individuals, by observation or experimentation, with the intention of promoting change". The field was slow to follow Witmer's example, but by 1914, there were 26 similar clinics in the US.

Even as clinical psychology was growing, working with issues of serious mental distress remained the domain of psychiatrists and neurologists. However, clinical psychologists continued to make inroads into this area due to their increasing skill at psychological assessment. Psychologists' reputation as assessment experts became solidified during World War I with the development of two intelligence tests, Army Alpha and Army Beta (testing verbal and nonverbal skills, respectively), which could be used with large groups of recruits. Due in large part to the success of these tests, assessment was to become the core discipline of clinical psychology for the next quarter-century, when another war would propel the field into treatment.

=== Early professional organizations ===
The field began to organize under the name "clinical psychology" in 1917 with the founding of the American Association of Clinical Psychology. This organization lasted until 1919, after which the American Psychological Association (founded by G. Stanley Hall in 1892) developed a section on clinical psychology, which offered certification until 1927. Growth in the field was slow for the next few years until various unconnected psychological organizations came together as the American Association of Applied Psychology in 1937, which acted as the primary forum for psychologists until after World War II when the APA reorganized. In 1945, the APA created what is now called Division 12, the Society for Clinical Psychology, which remains a leading organization in the field. Psychological societies and associations in other English-speaking countries developed similar divisions, including those in Britain, Canada, Australia, and New Zealand.

=== World War II and the integration of treatment ===
When World War II broke out, the military once again called upon clinical psychologists. As soldiers began to return from combat, psychologists started to notice symptoms of psychological trauma labeled "shell shock" (eventually to be termed post-traumatic stress disorder) that were best treated as soon as possible. Because physicians (including psychiatrists) were over-extended in treating bodily injuries, psychologists were called to help treat this condition. At the same time, female psychologists (who were excluded from the war effort) formed the National Council of Women Psychologists with the purpose of helping communities deal with the stresses of war and giving young mothers advice on child rearing. After the war, the Veterans Administration in the US made an enormous investment to set up programs to train doctoral-level clinical psychologists to help treat the thousands of veterans needing care. As a consequence, the US went from having no formal university programs in clinical psychology in 1946 to over half of all PhDs in psychology in 1950 being awarded in clinical psychology.

WWII helped bring dramatic changes to clinical psychology, not just in America but internationally as well. Graduate education in psychology began adding psychotherapy to the science and research focus based on the 1947 scientist-practitioner model, known today as the Boulder Model, for PhD programs in clinical psychology. Clinical psychology in Britain developed much like in the US after WWII, specifically within the context of the National Health Service with qualifications, standards, and salaries managed by the British Psychological Society.

=== Development of the Doctor of Psychology degree ===
By the 1960s, psychotherapy had become embedded within clinical psychology, but for many, the PhD educational model did not offer the necessary training for those interested in practice rather than research. There was a growing argument that said the field of psychology in the US had developed to a degree warranting explicit training in clinical practice. The concept of a practice-oriented degree was debated in 1965 and narrowly gained approval for a pilot program at the University of Illinois starting in 1968. Several other similar programs were instituted soon after, and in 1973, at the Vail Conference on Professional Training in Psychology, the practitioner–scholar model of clinical psychology—or Vail Model—resulting in the Doctor of Psychology (PsyD) degree was recognized. Although training would continue to include research skills and a scientific understanding of psychology, the intent would be to produce highly trained professionals, similar to programs in medicine, dentistry, and law. The first program explicitly based on the PsyD model was instituted at Rutgers University. Today, about half of all American graduate students in clinical psychology are enrolled in PsyD programs.

=== A changing profession ===
Since the 1970s, clinical psychology has continued growing into a robust profession and academic field of study. Although the exact number of practicing clinical psychologists is unknown, it is estimated that between 1974 and 1990, the number in the US grew from 20,000 to 63,000. Clinical psychologists continue to be experts in assessment and psychotherapy while expanding their focus to address issues of gerontology, sports, and the criminal justice system to name a few. One important field is health psychology, the fastest-growing employment setting for clinical psychologists in the past decade. Other major changes include the impact of managed care on mental health care; an increasing realization of the importance of knowledge relating to multicultural and diverse populations; and emerging privileges to prescribe psychotropic medication.

== Professional practice ==
Clinical psychologist
Occupation
- Names: Clinical psychologist
- Occupation type: Psychologist, Mental health professional
- Activity sectors: Psychology, Medicine, Health care, Forensic science, Psychological research, Psychological assessment

Description
- Competencies: Assessment and treatment of psychopathology
- Education required: Doctor of Psychology (PsyD); Or: Doctor of Philosophy (PhD)
- Fields of employment: Hospitals, clinics
- Related jobs: Psychiatrist; Psychotherapist

Clinical psychologists engage in a wide range of activities. Some focus solely on research into the assessment, treatment, or cause of mental illness and related conditions. Some teach, whether in a medical school or hospital setting, or in an academic department (e.g., psychology department) at an institution of higher education. The majority of clinical psychologists engage in some form of clinical practice, with professional services including psychological assessment, provision of psychotherapy, development and administration of clinical programs, and forensics (e.g., providing expert testimony in a legal proceeding).

In clinical practice, clinical psychologists may work with individuals, couples, families, or groups in a variety of settings, including private practices, hospitals, mental health organizations, schools, businesses, and non-profit agencies. Clinical psychologists who provide clinical services may also choose to specialize. Some specializations are codified and credentialed by regulatory agencies within the country of practice. In the United States, such specializations are credentialed by the American Board of Professional Psychology (ABPP).

== Training and certification to practice ==
Clinical psychologists study a generalist program in psychology plus postgraduate training and/or clinical placement and supervision. The length of training differs across the world, ranging from four years plus post-Bachelors supervised practice to a doctorate of three to six years which combines clinical placement. The practice of clinical psychology requires a license in the United States, Canada, the United Kingdom, and many other countries.

=== US and Canada ===
In the US, about half of all clinical psychology graduate students are being trained in PhD programs—a model that emphasizes research—with the other half in PsyD programs, which has more focus on practice (similar to professional degrees for medicine and law). Both models are accredited by the American Psychological Association and many other English-speaking psychological societies. A smaller number of schools offer accredited programs in clinical psychology resulting in a master's degree, which usually takes two to three years post-Bachelors.

Although each of the US states is somewhat different in terms of requirements and licenses, there are three common elements:

1. Graduation from an accredited school with the appropriate degree
2. Completion of supervised clinical experience or internship
3. Passing a written examination and, in some states, an oral examination

All U.S. state and Canadian province licensing boards are members of the Association of State and Provincial Psychology Boards (ASPPB), which created and maintains the Examination for Professional Practice in Psychology (EPPP). Many states require other examinations in addition to the EPPP, such as a jurisprudence (i.e. mental health law) examination and/or an oral examination. Most states also require a certain number of continuing education credits per year in order to renew a license, which can be obtained through various means, such as taking audited classes and attending approved workshops. Clinical psychologists require the psychologist license to practice, although other mental health provider licenses can be obtained with a master's degree, such as Marriage and Family Therapist (MFT), Licensed Professional Counselor (LPC), and Licensed Psychological Associate (LPA).

=== UK ===
In the UK, clinical psychologists undertake a Doctor of Clinical Psychology (DClinPsych), which is a practitioner doctorate with both clinical and research components. This is a three-year full-time salaried program sponsored by the National Health Service (NHS) and based in universities and the NHS. Entry into these programs is highly competitive and requires at least a three-year undergraduate degree in psychology plus some form of experience, usually in either the NHS as an assistant psychologist or in academia as a research assistant. It is not unusual for applicants to apply several times before being accepted onto a training course as only about one-fifth of applicants are accepted each year. These clinical psychology doctoral degrees are accredited by the British Psychological Society and the Health and Care Professions Council (HCPC). The HCPC is the statutory regulator for practitioner psychologists in the UK. Those who successfully complete clinical psychology doctoral degrees are eligible to apply for registration with the HPC as a clinical psychologist.

In the UK, registration as a clinical psychologist with the Health and Care Professions Council (HCPC) is necessary. The HCPC is the statutory regulator for practitioner psychologists in the UK. In the UK the following titles are restricted by law "registered psychologist" and "practitioner psychologist"; in addition, the specialist title "clinical psychologist" is also restricted by law.

=== India ===
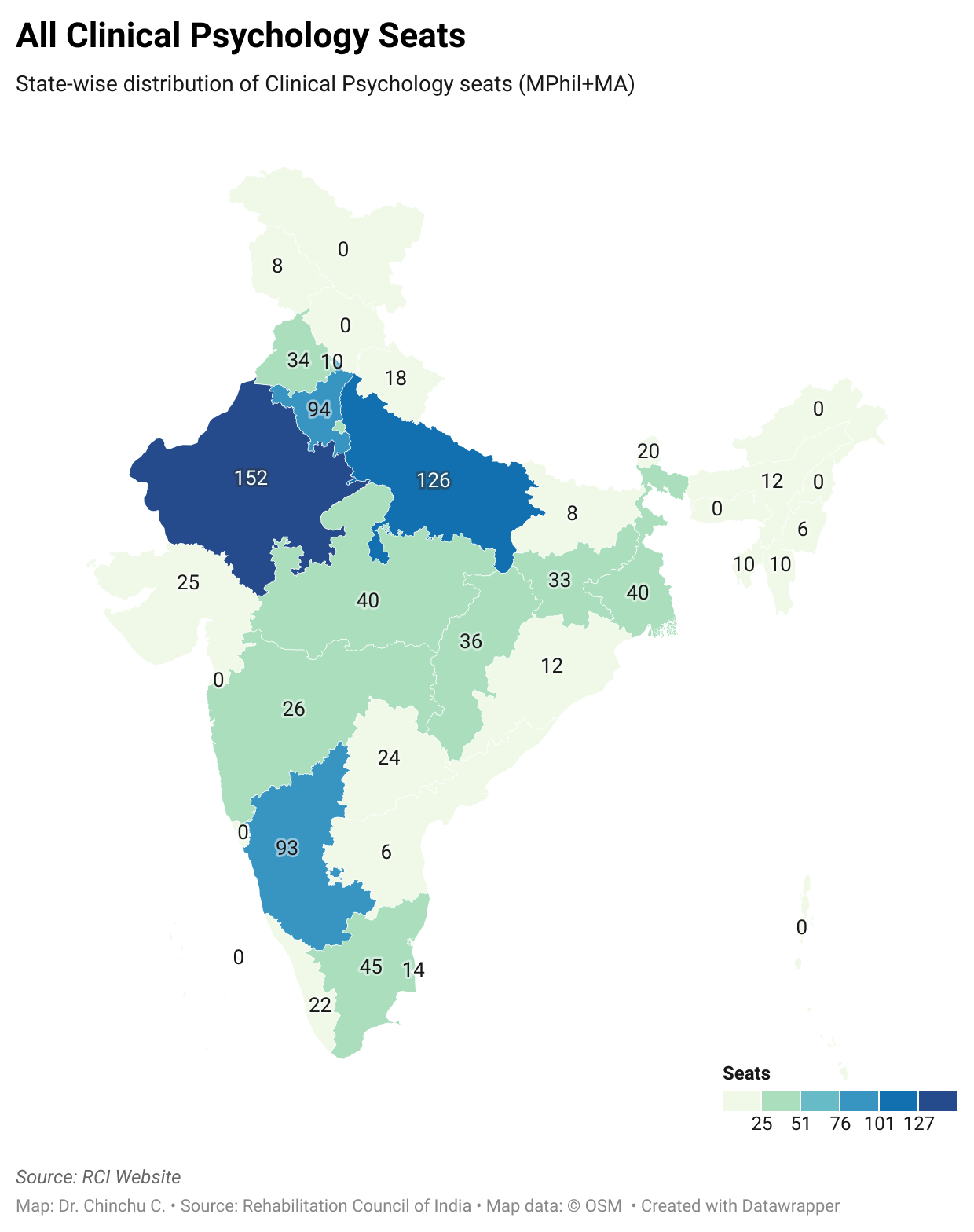
A graphical representation of available training seats for clinical psychologists in India (2025).

In India, the profession of clinical psychology is regulated by the Rehabilitation Council of India (RCI), a statutory body under the Ministry of Social Justice and Empowerment. The RCI is responsible for standardizing training curricula, recognizing institutions, and maintaining the Central Rehabilitation Register (CRR) of licensed professionals. Registration with the RCI is mandatory to practice legally as a clinical psychologist and to issue official certificates of mental illness.

The primary pathway to becoming an RCI-licensed clinical psychologist is through completing a specialized postgraduate program followed by RCI registration. A significant reform is underway, with the traditional M.Phil. in Clinical Psychology (a two-year program) being phased out and replaced by a new M.A. in Clinical Psychology program, in alignment with the National Education Policy (NEP) 2020. The 2025–26 academic year is expected to be the final intake for the M.Phil. program.

Other RCI-recognized professional programs include the Doctor of Psychology (Psy.D.) and the Professional Diploma in Clinical Psychology (PDCP).

==== Recognized Institutions ====
These programs are offered by institutions recognized by the RCI. As of the 2025–26 cycle, recognized institutions for the M.Phil. program included major government hospitals, medical colleges, and universities across the country. Following the transition to the M.A. program, these institutions are expected to offer the new curriculum from the 2026–27 session onwards.

=== Pakistan ===
In Pakistan, training is through institutions like University of Management and Technology, University of the Punjab, University of Central Punjab, Fatima Jinnah Women's University, National University of Medical Sciences. Some psychological associations are The Pakistan Psychological Association(PPA), Pakistan Association of Clinical Psychologists(PACP), Pakistan Psychological Association(PPA) and Pakistan Psychological Society(PPS).

== Assessment ==
An important area of expertise for many clinical psychologists is psychological assessment, and there are indications that as many as 91% of psychologists engage in this core clinical practice. Such evaluation is usually done in service to gaining insight into and forming hypotheses about psychological or behavioral problems. As such, the results of such assessments are usually used to create generalized impressions (rather than diagnoses) in service to informing treatment planning. Methods include formal testing measures, interviews, reviewing records, clinical observation, and physical examination.

=== Measurement domains ===
There exist hundreds of various assessment tools, although only a few have been shown to have both high validity (i.e., test actually measures what it claims to measure) and reliability (i.e., consistency). Many psychological assessment measures are restricted for use by those with advanced training in mental health. For instance, Pearson (one of the many companies with rights and protection of psychological assessment tools) separates who can administer, interpret, and report on certain tests. Anybody is able to access Qualification Level A tests. Those who intend to use assessment tools at Qualification Level B must hold a master's degree in psychology, education, speech language pathology, occupational therapy, social work, counseling, or in a field closely related to the intended use of the assessment, and formal training in the ethical administration, scoring, and interpretation of clinical assessments. Those with access to Qualification C (highest level) assessment measures must hold a doctorate degree in psychology, education, or a closely related field with formal training in the ethical administration, scoring, and interpretation of clinical assessments related to the intended use of the assessment.

Psychological measures generally fall within one of several categories, including the following:

- Intelligence & achievement tests – These tests are designed to measure certain specific kinds of cognitive functioning (often referred to as IQ) in comparison to a norming group. These tests, such as the WISC-IV and the WAIS, attempt to measure such traits as general knowledge, verbal skill, memory, attention span, logical reasoning, and visual/spatial perception. Several tests have been shown to predict accurately certain kinds of performance, especially scholastic. Other tests in this category include the WRAML and the WIAT.
- Personality tests – Tests of personality aim to describe patterns of behavior, thoughts, and feelings. They generally fall within two categories: objective and projective. Objective measures, such as the MMPI, are based on restricted answers—such as yes/no, true/false, or a rating scale—which allow for the computation of scores that can be compared to a normative group. Projective tests, such as the Rorschach inkblot test, allow for open-ended answers, often based on ambiguous stimuli. Other commonly used personality assessment measures include the PAI and the NEO
- Neuropsychological tests – Neuropsychological tests consist of specifically designed tasks used to measure psychological functions known to be linked to a particular brain structure or pathway. They are typically used to assess impairment after an injury or illness known to affect neurocognitive functioning, or when used in research, to contrast neuropsychological abilities across experimental groups.
- Diagnostic Measurement Tools – Clinical psychologists are able to diagnose psychological disorders and related disorders found in the DSM-5 and ICD-10. Many assessment tests have been developed to complement the clinicians clinical observation and other assessment activities. Some of these include the SCID-IV, the MINI, as well as some specific to certain psychological disorders such as the CAPS-5 for trauma, the ASEBA, and the K-SADS for affective and Schizophrenia in children.
- Clinical observation – Clinical psychologists are also trained to gather data by observing behavior. The clinical interview is a vital part of the assessment, even when using other formalized tools, which can employ either a structured or unstructured format. Such assessment looks at certain areas, such as general appearance and behavior, mood and affects, perception, comprehension, orientation, insight, memory, and content of the communication. One psychiatric example of a formal interview is the mental status examination, which is often used in psychiatry as a screening tool for treatment or further testing.

=== Diagnosis ===
Psychological assessment usually includes determining a mental disorder diagnosis. Many countries use the International Statistical Classification of Diseases and Related Health Problems (ICD-10 or ICD-11) while the US most often uses the Diagnostic and Statistical Manual of Mental Disorders (DSM-5). Both are nosological systems that largely assume categorical disorders diagnosed through the application of sets of criteria including symptoms and signs.

Several new models are being discussed, including a "dimensional model" based on empirically validated models of human differences (such as the five factor model of personality) and a "psychosocial model", which would take changing, intersubjective states into greater account. The proponents of these models claim that they would offer greater diagnostic flexibility and clinical utility without depending on the medical concept of illness. However, they also admit that these models are not yet robust enough to gain widespread use, and should continue to be developed.

=== Clinical v. mechanical prediction ===
Clinical assessment can be characterized as a prediction problem where the purpose of assessment is to make inferences (predictions) about past, present, or future behavior. For example, many therapy decisions are made on the basis of what a clinician expects will help a patient make therapeutic gains. Once observations have been collected (e.g., psychological testing results, diagnostic impressions, clinical history, X-ray, etc.), there are two mutually exclusive ways to combine those sources of information to arrive at a decision, diagnosis, or prediction. One way is to combine the data in an algorithmic, or "mechanical" fashion. Mechanical prediction methods are simply a mode of combination of data to arrive at a decision/prediction of behavior (e.g., treatment response). The mechanical prediction does not preclude any type of data from being combined; it can incorporate clinical judgments, properly coded, in the algorithm. The defining characteristic is that, once the data to be combined is given, the mechanical approach will make a prediction that is 100% reliable. That is, it will make exactly the same prediction for exactly the same data every time. Clinical prediction, on the other hand, does not guarantee this, as it depends on the decision-making processes of the clinician making the judgment, their current state of mind, and knowledge base.

What has come to be called the "clinical versus statistical prediction" debate was first described in detail in 1954 by Paul Meehl, where he explored the claim that mechanical (formal, algorithmic) methods of data combination could outperform clinical (e.g., subjective, informal, "in the clinician's head") methods when such combinations are used to arrive at a prediction of behavior. Meehl concluded that mechanical modes of combination performed as well or better than clinical modes. Subsequent meta-analyses of studies that directly compare mechanical and clinical predictions have borne out Meehl's 1954 conclusions. A 2009 survey of practicing clinical psychologists found that clinicians almost exclusively use their clinical judgment to make behavioral predictions for their patients, including diagnosis and prognosis.

== Intervention ==
Psychotherapy involves a formal relationship between professional and client—usually an individual, couple, family, or small group—that employs a set of procedures intended to form a therapeutic alliance, explore the nature of psychological problems, and encourage new ways of thinking, feeling, or behaving.

Clinicians have a wide range of individual interventions to draw from, often guided by their training—for example, a cognitive behavioral therapy (CBT) clinician might use worksheets to record distressing cognitions, a psychoanalyst might encourage free association, while a psychologist trained in Gestalt techniques might focus on immediate interactions between client and therapist. Clinical psychologists generally seek to base their work on research evidence and outcome studies as well as on trained clinical judgment. Although there are literally dozens of recognized therapeutic orientations, their differences can often be categorized on two dimensions: insight vs. action and in-session vs. out-session.

- Insight – emphasis is on gaining a greater understanding of the motivations underlying one's thoughts and feelings (e.g. psychodynamic therapy)
- Action – focus is on making changes in how one thinks and acts (e.g. solution focused therapy, cognitive behavioral therapy)
- In-session – interventions center on the here-and-now interaction between client and therapist (e.g. humanistic therapy, Gestalt therapy)
- Out-session – a large portion of therapeutic work is intended to happen outside of session (e.g. bibliotherapy, rational emotive behavior therapy)

The methods used are also different in regards to the population being served as well as the context and nature of the problem. Therapy will look very different between, say, a traumatized child, a depressed but high-functioning adult, a group of people recovering from substance dependence, and a ward of the state suffering from terrifying delusions. Other elements that play a critical role in the process of psychotherapy include the environment, culture, age, cognitive functioning, motivation, and duration (i.e. brief or long-term therapy).

=== Four main schools ===
Many clinical psychologists are integrative or eclectic and draw from the evidence base across different models of therapy in an integrative way, rather than using a single specific model.

In the UK, clinical psychologists have to show competence in at least two models of therapy, including CBT, to gain their doctorate. The British Psychological Society Division of Clinical Psychology has been vocal about the need to follow the evidence base rather than being wedded to a single model of therapy.

In the US, intervention applications and research are dominated in training and practice by essentially four major schools of practice: psychodynamic, humanism, behavioral/cognitive behavioral, and systems or family therapy.

==== Psychodynamic ====
The psychodynamic perspective developed out of the psychoanalysis of Sigmund Freud. The core object of psychoanalysis is to make the unconscious conscious—to make the client aware of his or her own primal drives (namely those relating to sex and aggression) and the various defenses used to keep them in check. The essential tools of the psychoanalytic process are the use of free association and an examination of the client's transference towards the therapist, defined as the tendency to take unconscious thoughts or emotions about a significant person (e.g. a parent) and "transfer" them onto another person. Major variations on Freudian psychoanalysis practiced today include self psychology, ego psychology, and object relations theory. These general orientations now fall under the umbrella term psychodynamic psychology, with common themes including examination of transference and defenses, an appreciation of the power of the unconscious, and a focus on how early developments in childhood have shaped the client's current psychological state.

==== Humanistic/Experiential ====
Humanistic psychology was developed in the 1950s in reaction to both behaviorism and psychoanalysis, largely due to the person-centered therapy of Carl Rogers (often referred to as Rogerian Therapy) and existential psychology developed by Viktor Frankl and Rollo May. Rogers believed that a client needed only three things from a clinician to experience therapeutic improvement—congruence, unconditional positive regard, and empathetic understanding. By using phenomenology, intersubjectivity and first-person categories, the humanistic approach seeks to get a glimpse of the whole person and not just the fragmented parts of the personality. This aspect of holism links up with another common aim of humanistic practice in clinical psychology, which is to seek an integration of the whole person, also called self-actualization. From 1980, Hans-Werner Gessmann integrated the ideas of humanistic psychology into group psychotherapy as humanistic psychodrama. According to humanistic thinking, each individual person already has inbuilt potentials and resources that might help them to build a stronger personality and self-concept. The mission of the humanistic psychologist is to help the individual employ these resources via the therapeutic relationship.

Emotion focused therapy/Emotionally focused therapy (EFT), not to be confused with Emotional Freedom Techniques, was initially informed by humanistic–phenomenological and Gestalt theories of therapy. "Emotion Focused Therapy can be defined as the practice of therapy informed by an understanding of the role of emotion in psychotherapeutic change. EFT is founded on a close and careful analysis of the meanings and contributions of emotion to human experience and change in psychotherapy. This focus leads therapist and client toward strategies that promotes the awareness, acceptance, expression, utilization, regulation, and transformation of emotion as well as corrective emotional experience with the therapist. The goals of EFT are strengthening the self, regulating affect, and creating new meaning". Similarly to some Psychodynamic therapy approaches, EFT pulls heavily from attachment theory. Pioneers of EFT are Les Greenberg and Sue Johnson. EFT is often used in therapy with individuals, and may be especially useful for couples therapy. Founded in 1998, Sue Johnson and others lead the International Centre for Excellence in Emotion Focused Therapy (ICEEFT) where clinicians can find EFT training internationally. EFT is also a commonly chosen modality to treat clinically diagnosable trauma.

==== Behavioral and cognitive behavioral ====
Cognitive behavioral therapy (CBT) developed from the combination of cognitive therapy and rational emotive behavior therapy, both of which grew out of cognitive psychology and behaviorism. CBT is based on the theory that how we think (cognition), how we feel (emotion), and how we act (behavior) are related and interact together in complex ways. In this perspective, certain dysfunctional ways of interpreting and appraising the world (often through schemas or beliefs) can contribute to emotional distress or result in behavioral problems. The object of many cognitive behavioral therapies is to discover and identify the biased, dysfunctional ways of relating or reacting and through different methodologies help clients transcend these in ways that will lead to increased well-being. There are many techniques used, such as systematic desensitization, socratic questioning, and keeping a cognition observation log. Modified approaches that fall into the category of CBT have also developed, including dialectic behavior therapy and mindfulness-based cognitive therapy.

Research has shown that cognitive behavioral therapy (CBT) can help reduce symptoms of anxiety and depression. Studies have found that CBT is effective for several anxiety disorders and can also be used to treat major depression. However, treatment outcomes may vary depending on the condition and the individual.

Research has shown that cognitive behavioral therapy (CBT) can be effective in treating anxiety and related disorders.

A meta-analysis of 41 randomized placebo-controlled trials involving 2,843 participants found that CBT was more effective than placebo overall, although treatment outcomes varied across different disorders.

CBT has also studied as a treatment for depression in adults. A meta-analysis of 115 studies that CBT was effective compared with control conditions. However, the researchers reported that the estimated benefits were smaller when study quality and publication bias were considered.

Behavior therapy is an evidence-based approach rooted in behaviorism. In behavior therapy, environmental events predict the way we think and feel. Our behavior influences our environment, which in turn can affect how we behave. Sometimes the feedback leads the behavior to increase- reinforcement and sometimes the behavior decreases- punishment. Oftentimes behavior therapists are called applied behavior analysts or behavioral health counselors. They have studied many areas from developmental disabilities to depression and anxiety disorders. In the area of mental health and addictions a recent article looked at APA's list for well established and promising practices and found a considerable number of them based on the principles of operant and respondent conditioning. Multiple assessment techniques have come from this approach including functional analysis (psychology), which has found a strong focus in the school system. In addition, multiple intervention programs have come from this tradition including community reinforcement approach for treating addictions, acceptance and commitment therapy, functional analytic psychotherapy, including dialectic behavior therapy and behavioral activation. In addition, specific techniques such as contingency management and exposure therapy have come from this tradition.

==== Systems or family therapy ====
Systems or family therapy works with couples and families, and emphasizes family relationships as an important factor in psychological health. The central focus tends to be on interpersonal dynamics, especially in terms of how change in one person will affect the entire system. Therapy is therefore conducted with as many significant members of the "system" as possible. Goals can include improving communication, establishing healthy roles, creating alternative narratives, and addressing problematic behaviors.

=== Other therapeutic perspectives ===
There exist dozens of recognized schools or orientations of psychotherapy—the list below represents a few influential orientations not given above. Although they all have some typical set of techniques practitioners employ, they are generally better known for providing a framework of theory and philosophy that guides a therapist in his or her working with a client.

- Existential – Existential psychotherapy postulates that people are largely free to choose who we are and how we interpret and interact with the world. It intends to help the client find deeper meaning in life and to accept responsibility for living. As such, it addresses fundamental issues of life, such as death, aloneness, and freedom. The therapist emphasizes the client's ability to be self-aware, freely make choices in the present, establish personal identity and social relationships, create meaning, and cope with the natural anxiety of living.
- Gestalt – Gestalt therapy was primarily founded by Fritz Perls in the 1950s. This therapy is perhaps best known for using techniques designed to increase self-awareness, the best-known perhaps being the "empty chair technique". Such techniques are intended to explore resistance to "authentic contact", resolve internal conflicts, and help the client complete "unfinished business".
- Postmodern – Postmodern psychology says that the experience of reality is a subjective construction built upon language, social context, and history, with no essential truths. Since "mental illness" and "mental health" are not recognized as objective, definable realities, the postmodern psychologist instead sees the goal of therapy strictly as something constructed by the client and therapist. Forms of postmodern psychotherapy include narrative therapy, solution-focused therapy, and coherence therapy.
- Transpersonal – The transpersonal perspective places a stronger focus on the spiritual facet of human experience. It is not a set of techniques so much as a willingness to help a client explore spirituality and/or transcendent states of consciousness. Transpersonal psychology is concerned with helping clients achieve their highest potential.
- Multiculturalism – Although the theoretical foundations of psychology are rooted in European culture, there is a growing recognition that there exist profound differences between various ethnic and social groups and that systems of psychotherapy need to take those differences into greater consideration. Further, the generations following immigrant migration will have some combination of two or more cultures—with aspects coming from the parents and from the surrounding society—and this process of acculturation can play a strong role in therapy (and might itself be the presenting problem). Culture influences ideas about change, help-seeking, locus of control, authority, and the importance of the individual versus the group, all of which can potentially clash with certain givens in mainstream psychotherapeutic theory and practice. As such, there is a growing movement to integrate knowledge of various cultural groups in order to inform therapeutic practice in a more culturally sensitive and effective way.
- Feminism – Feminist therapy is an orientation arising from the disparity between the origin of most psychological theories (which have male authors) and the majority of people seeking counseling being female. It focuses on societal, cultural, and political causes and solutions to issues faced in the counseling process. It openly encourages the client to participate in the world in a more social and political way.
- Positive psychology – Positive psychology is the scientific study of human happiness and well-being, which started to gain momentum in 1998 due to the call of Martin Seligman, then president of the APA. The history of psychology shows that the field has been primarily dedicated to addressing mental illness rather than mental wellness. Applied positive psychology's main focus, therefore, is to increase one's positive experience of life and ability to flourish by promoting such things as optimism about the future, a sense of flow in the present, and personal traits like courage, perseverance, and altruism. There is now preliminary empirical evidence to show that by promoting Seligman's three components of happiness—positive emotion (the pleasant life), engagement (the engaged life), and meaning (the meaningful life)—positive therapy can decrease clinical depression.

Community psychology approaches are often used for psychological prevention of harm and clinical intervention.

=== Integration ===
In the last couple of decades, there has been a growing movement to integrate the various therapeutic approaches, especially with an increased understanding of cultural, gender, spiritual, and sexual-orientation issues. Clinical psychologists are beginning to look at the various strengths and weaknesses of each orientation while also working with related fields, such as neuroscience, behavioural genetics, evolutionary biology, and psychopharmacology. The result is a growing practice of eclecticism, with psychologists learning various systems and the most efficacious methods of therapy with the intent to provide the best solution for any given problem.

== Professional ethics ==
The field of clinical psychology in most countries is strongly regulated by a code of ethics. In the US, professional ethics are largely defined by the APA Code of Conduct, which is often used by states to define licensing requirements. The APA Code generally sets a higher standard than that which is required by law as it is designed to guide responsible behavior, the protection of clients, and the improvement of individuals, organizations, and society. The Code is applicable to all psychologists in both research and applied fields.

The APA Code is based on five principles: Beneficence and Nonmaleficence, Fidelity and Responsibility, Integrity, Justice, and Respect for People's Rights and Dignity. Detailed elements address how to resolve ethical issues, competence, human relations, privacy and confidentiality, advertising, record keeping, fees, training, research, publication, assessment, and therapy.

The Canadian Psychological Association ethical code principle's are: Respect for the Dignity of Persons and Peoples, Responsible Caring, Integrity in Relationships, and Responsibility to Society. It is considered very similar to the APA's Code.

In the UK the British Psychological Society has published a Code of Conduct and Ethics for clinical psychologists. This has four key areas: Respect, Competence, Responsibility and Integrity. Other European professional organizations have similar codes of conduct and ethics.

The Asian Federation for Psychotherapy published a code of ethics in 2008 with the following principles: Beneficence, Responsibility, Integrity, Justices, and Respect. Similar to the APA code, it provides detailed instructions for the conduct of psychologists, specifically psychotherapists. Russia, India, Iran, Kazakhstan, China, Malaysia, and Japan are member countries.

The National Latina/o Psychological Association adopted their current ethical guidelines in 2018, stating that "the traditional Eurocentric foundations in mainstream psychology have provided culturally bound knowledge about worldviews, ways of living, and cultural practices." Their principles are: Respect and Responsibility, Ethical Dilemmas, Ethical Decision-Making and Legal Responsibility, Consultation, Justice and Advocacy, Self-Awareness and Social-Consciousness, Action and Accountability, Training and Creating Infrastructure, and Mentorship.

== Comparison with other mental health professions ==
=== Psychiatry ===
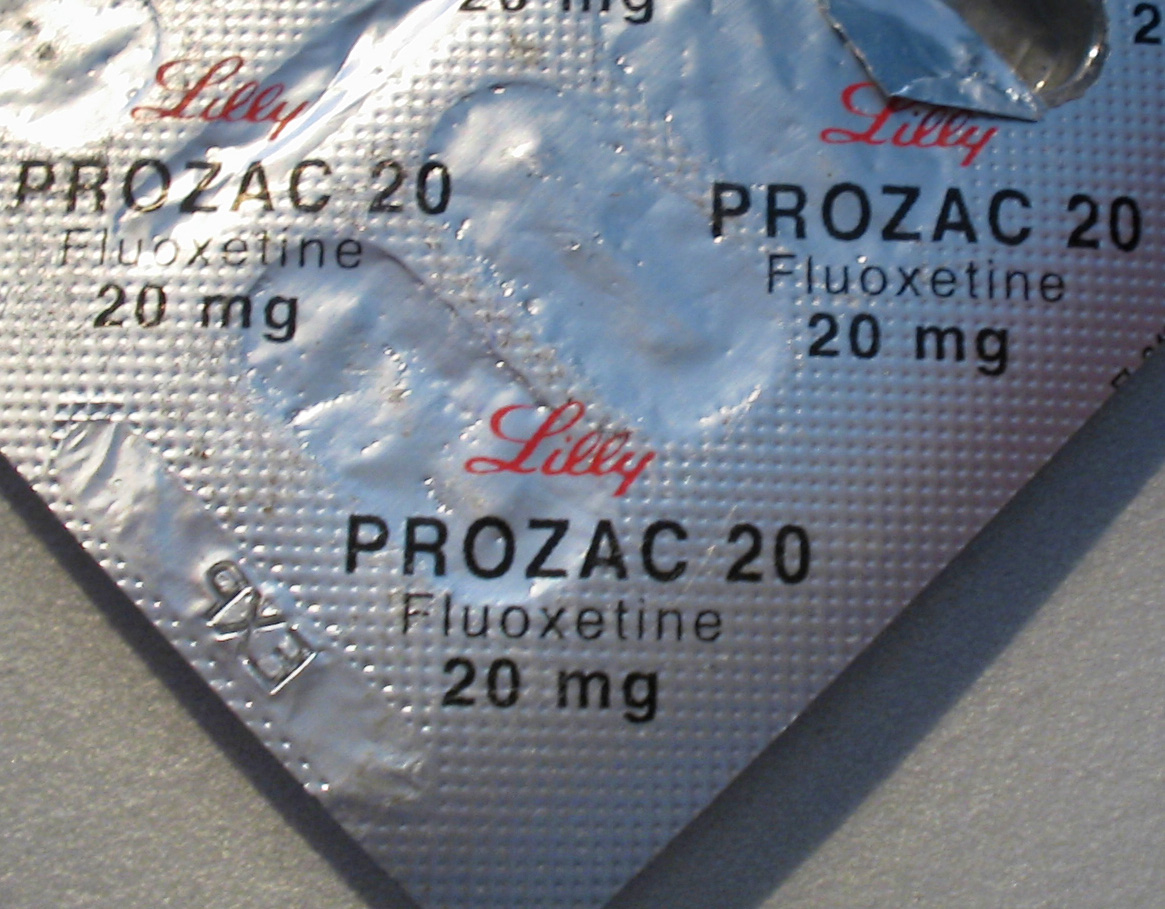
Fluoxetine hydrochloride, branded by Lilly as Prozac, is an antidepressant drug prescribed by physicians, psychiatrists, and some nurses.

Although clinical psychologists and psychiatrists can be said to share a same fundamental aim—the alleviation of mental distress—their training, outlook, and methodologies are often quite different. Perhaps the most significant difference is that psychiatrists are licensed physicians. As such, psychiatrists often use the medical model to assess psychological problems (i.e., those they treat are seen as patients with an illness) and can use psychotropic medications as a method of addressing the illness—although some also employ psychotherapy as well. Psychiatrists are able to conduct physical examinations, order and interpret laboratory tests and EEGs, and may order brain imaging studies such as computed tomography (CT or CAT), MRI, and PET scanning. Conversely, clinical psychologists conduct specialist assessment and psychometric testing. Such assessments and tests would not normally only be administered and interpreted by psychologists due to their advanced training in psychometric assessment. However, it is worth nothing that many psychological tests such as the Minnesota Multiphasic Personality Inventory (MMPI) require further specialised training by psychologists before use. Standard clinical psychologists also usually possess more advanced training and specialist knowledge in psychosocial development and psychological therapies. Conversely, clinical psychologists conduct specialist assessment and psychometric testing.

Clinical psychologists generally do not prescribe medication, although there is a movement for psychologists to have prescribing privileges. These medical privileges require additional training and education. To date, medical psychologists (prescribing psychologists) may prescribe psychotropic medications in Guam, Iowa, Idaho, Illinois, New Mexico, Louisiana, Colorado, Utah, Vermont, the Public Health Service, the Indian Health Service, and the United States Military. In contrast, psychiatrists are legally authorized to prescribe psychotropic medications in all states of the U.S. and in all provinces of Canada. However, psychiatrists are not usually involved in psychometric assessment.

In education, clinical psychologists attend a graduate institution and have a Doctor of Philosophy (Ph.D.) or a Doctor of Psychology (Psy.D.) degree, usually following both an undergraduate and master's degree in Psychology or a related discipline. One exception here is Australia, where clinical psychologists only need to complete a 2 year master's degree Conversely, psychiatrists complete their studies at a medical school and hold a medical degree (M.D.), Bachelor of Medicine, Bachelor of Surgery (with additional post-graduate training), or an osteopathic degree and the (D.O.) which is only available in the United States.

Due to their scientist-practitioner model of training, clinical psychologists have more advanced research knowledge and skills, including advanced training in statistics, compared with standard psychiatric training.

=== Counseling psychology ===
Counseling psychologists undergo the same level of rigor in study and use many of the same interventions and tools as clinical psychologists, including psychotherapy and assessment. Traditionally, counseling psychologists helped people with what might be considered normal or moderate psychological problems—such as the feelings of anxiety or sadness resulting from major life changes or events. However, that distinction has faded over time, and of the counseling psychologists who do not go into academia (which does not involve treatment or diagnosis), the majority of counseling psychologists treat mental illness alongside clinical psychologists. Many counseling psychologists also receive specialized training in career assessment, group therapy, and relationship counseling.

Counseling psychology as a field values multiculturalism and social advocacy, often stimulating research in multicultural issues. There are fewer counseling psychology graduate programs than those for clinical psychology and they are more often housed in departments of education rather than psychology. Counseling psychologists tend to be more frequently employed in university counseling centers compared to hospitals and private practice for clinical psychologists. However, counseling and clinical psychologists can be employed in a variety of settings, with a large degree of overlap (prisons, colleges, community mental health, non-profits, corporations, private practice, hospitals and Veterans Affairs).

Comparison of mental health professionals in the US
Occupation	Degree	Common licenses	Prescription privilege	Mean 2022 income (USD)
Clinical psychologist	PhD/PsyD/EdD	Psychologist	Varies by state	$90,130
Counseling psychologist (doctorate)	PhD/PsyD/EdD	Psychologist	No	$65,000
Counselor (master's)	MA/MS/MEd	MFT/LPC/LHMC/LPA	No	$49,710
School psychologist	PhD/EdD/MS/EdS	School psychologist	No	$81,500
Psychiatrist	MD/DO	Psychiatrist	Yes	$226,880
Clinical social worker	PhD/DSW/MSW	LCSW	No	$55,350
Psychiatric nurse	MSN/BSN	RN	No	$75,330
Psychiatric and mental health nurse practitioner	DNP/PhD/MSN	APRN/APN/PMHNP	Yes (varies by state)	$121,610
Expressive/Art therapist	MA	ATR	No	$55,900

=== School psychology ===
School psychologists are primarily concerned with the academic, social, and emotional well-being of children and adolescents within a scholastic environment. In the UK, they are known as "educational psychologists". Like clinical (and counseling) psychologists, school psychologists with doctoral degrees are eligible for licensure as health service psychologists, and many work in private practice. Unlike clinical psychologists, they receive much more training in education, child development and behavior, and the psychology of learning. Common degrees include the Educational Specialist Degree (EdS), Doctor of Philosophy (PhD), and Doctor of Education (EdD).

Traditional job roles for school psychologists employed in school settings have focused mainly on assessment of students to determine their eligibility for special education services in schools, and on consultation with teachers and other school professionals to design and carry out interventions on behalf of students. Other major roles also include offering individual and group therapy with children and their families, designing prevention programs (e.g. for reducing dropout), evaluating school programs, and working with teachers and administrators to help maximize teaching efficacy, both in the classroom and systemically.

=== Clinical social work ===
Social workers provide a variety of services, generally concerned with social problems, their causes, and their solutions. With specific training, clinical social workers may also provide psychological counseling (in the US and Canada), in addition to more traditional social work.

=== Occupational therapy ===
Occupational therapy—often abbreviated OT—is the "use of productive or creative activity in the treatment or rehabilitation of physically, cognitively, or emotionally disabled people." Most commonly, occupational therapists work with people with disabilities to enable them to maximize their skills and abilities. Occupational therapy practitioners are skilled professionals whose education includes the study of human growth and development with specific emphasis on the physical, emotional, psychological, sociocultural, cognitive and environmental components of illness and injury. They commonly work alongside clinical psychologists in settings such as inpatient and outpatient mental health, pain management clinics, eating disorder clinics, and child development services. OT's use support groups, individual counseling sessions, and activity-based approaches to address psychiatric symptoms and maximize functioning in life activities.

== Debate over treatment approaches ==
Despite some evidence showing that all the major therapeutic orientations are about of equal effectiveness, there remains much debate about the efficacy of various forms of treatment in use in clinical psychology.

== See also ==
- Anti-psychiatry
- Applied psychology
- Clinical Associate (Psychology)
- Clinical neuropsychology
- Clinical trial
- List of clinical psychologists
- List of credentials in psychology
- List of psychotherapies
- Outline of psychology
- Psychiatric and mental health nursing
- Psychoneuroimmunology
