= Mental health professional =

Health care practitioner or community services provider

A mental health professional is a health care practitioner or social and human services provider who offers services for the purpose of improving an individual's mental health or to treat mental disorders. This broad category was developed as a name for community personnel who worked in the new community mental health agencies begun in the 1970s to assist individuals moving from state hospitals, to prevent admissions, and to provide support in homes, jobs, education, and community. These individuals (i.e., state office personnel, private sector personnel, and non-profit, now voluntary sector personnel) were the forefront brigade to develop the community programs, which today may be referred to by names such as supported housing, psychiatric rehabilitation, supported or transitional employment, sheltered workshops, supported education, daily living skills, affirmative industries, dual diagnosis treatment, individual and family psychoeducation, adult day care, foster care, family services and mental health counseling.

Psychiatrists - physicians who use the biomedical model to treat mental health problems - may prescribe medication. The term counselors often refers to office-based professionals who offer therapy sessions to their clients, operated by organizations such as pastoral counseling (which may or may not work with long-term services clients) and family counselors. Mental health counselors may refer to counselors working in residential services in the field of mental health in community programs.

== As community professionals ==
As Dr. William Anthony, father of psychiatric rehabilitation, described, psychiatric nurses (RNMH, RMN, CPN), clinical psychologists (PsyD or PhD), clinical social workers (MSW or MSSW), mental health counselors (MA or MS), professional counselors, pharmacists, as well as many other professionals are often educated in "psychiatric fields" or conversely, educated in a generic community approach (e.g. human services programs or health and human services in 2013). However, his primary concern is education that leads to a willingness to work with "long-term services and supports" community support in the community to lead to better life quality for the individual, the families and the community.

The community support framework in the US of the 1970s is taken-for-granted as the base for new treatment developments (e.g., eating disorders, drug addiction programs) which tend to be free-standing clinics for specific "disorders". Typically, the term "mental health professional" does not refer to other categorical disability areas, such as intellectual and developmental disability (which trains its own professionals and maintains its own journals, and US state systems and institutions). Psychiatric rehabilitation has also been reintroduced into the transfer to behavioral health care systems.

== As certified and licensed (across institutions and communities) ==
These professionals often deal with the same illnesses, disorders, conditions, and issues (though may separate on-site locations, such as a hospital or community for the same clientele); however, their scope of practice differs and more particularly, their positions and roles in the fields of mental health services and systems. The most significant difference between mental health professionals are the laws regarding required education and training across the various professions. However, the most significant change has been the Supreme Court Olmstead decision on the most integrated setting which should further reduce state hospital utilization; yet with new professionals seeking right for community treatment orders and rights to administer medications (original community programs, residents taught to self-administer medications, 1970s).

In 2013, new mental health practitioners are licensed or certified in the community (e.g., PhD, education in private clinical practice) by states, degrees and certifications are offered in fields such as psychiatric rehabilitation (MS, PhD), BA psychology (liberal arts, experimental/clinical/existential/community) to MA licensing is now more popular, BA (to PhD) mid-level program management, qualified civil service professionals, and social workers remain the mainstay of community admissions procedures (licensed by state, often generic training) in the US. Surprisingly, state direction has moved from psychiatry or clinical psychology to community leadership and professionalization of community services management.

Entry-level recruitment and training remain a primary concern (since the 1970s, then often competing with fast food positions), and the US Direct Support Workforce includes an emphasis on also training of psychiatric aides, behavioral aides, and addictions aides to work in homes and communities. The Centers for Medicaid and Medicare have new provisions for "self-direction" in services and new options are in place for individual plans for better life outcomes. Community programs are increasingly using health care financing, such as Medicaid, and Mental Health Parity is now law in the US.

== Professional distinctions ==
=== Comparison of American mental health professionals ===
Occupation	Degree	Common licenses	Prescription privilege	Average income (US$)
Psychiatrist	MD/DO	Physician	Yes	$275,000
Psychiatric Rehabilitation Counselor	Master of Rehabilitation Sciences PhD Doctor of Philosophy	Similar to Related Personnel (Cognitive Sciences), Rehabilitation Counselors	No	$50,000
Clinical Psychologist	PhD/PsyD	Psychologist	Varies by State (Note: Currently, psychologists may prescribe in six states: Colorado, Iowa, Idaho, Illinois, Louisiana, and New Mexico, as well as in the Public Health Service, the Indian Health Service, the U.S. military, and Guam.)	$85,000
School Psychologist	Doctoral level PhD/EdD/PsyD Post-master's terminal degree (not doctoral level) EdS Doctoral degrees, PhD Inclusion educators Master's level MA/MS	Certified School Psychology, National Certified School Psychologist	No	$78,000
Counselor/Psychotherapist (Doctorate)	PhD/EdD/DMFT	Psychologist	No	$45,000-$75,000
Counselor/Psychotherapist/Rehabilitation/Mental Health (Master's)	MA/MS/MC plus two to three years of post-master's supervised clinical experience	Mental health counselors/LMFT/LCPC/LPC/LPA/LMHC	No	$49,000
Clinical or Psychiatric Social Worker	MSW/DSW/PhD plus two to three years of post-master's supervised clinical experience	LCSW/LMSW/LSW	No	$50,700
Social Worker (agency based master's/doctoral levels)	MSW/DSW/PhD	LMSW/GSW/LSW	No	$46,170-$70,000
Social Worker (bachelor or diploma level)	BSW or SSW	RSW, RSSW, SWA, social work assistant	No	$35,000
Occupational therapist (Doctorate/master level)	MOT, MSOT, OTD, ScD, PhD	Related supervised community personnel in physical, speech and communication, OTR, COTA	No	$45,000-69,630
Licensed behavior analysts Licensed dual inclusion educators (Doctorate/master level) Behavior analyst, substance abuse and behavioral disorders, "inclusion educator"	PhD/EdD/MS/MEd/MA	LBA/LBS/BCBA/BCBA-D Dual Licensed inclusion educator	No	$60,000, $80,000 up for inclusion educator
Psychiatric-mental health nurse practitioner	MSN/DNP/PhD	PMHNP-BC	Yes	$128,000
Physician assistant	MPAS/MHS/MMS/DScPA	PA/PA-C/APA-C/RPA/RPA-C	Yes	$124,000
Expressive Therapist/Creative Arts Therapist	MA/ATR/ATR-BC	ATR-BC/MT-BC/BC-DMT/RDT/CPT	No	$30,000-70,000

Additional Sources/Clarifications: now operating programs with health care financing in the community. Higher-paid medical and health services manager which only operate facilities, considered to be easier than dispersed services management in the community for long-term services and supports (LTSS) often by disability NGOs or state governments (civil service).

The Mental Health Professional Class has often not been included in these occupational schemas in which Occupational Handbooks often separate Human Service Management Classes and Professional Classes from the term Health Care. Common salary ranges are in the $30,000-40,000 range for the higher professional at the small community agency. The professionals are considered to be part of the federal Health and Human Services Professions. Their responsibilities at the highest levels are greater than a psychiatric assistant who is responsible, to date, only to the psychiatrist. The occupational therapist is considered as an aide to that professional level, as is a behavioral specialist as hired by the agency and the nurse practitioner. Mental health workers in the community (e.g., workers with the homeless, in homes, families and jails, community programs such as group homes) may still be termed Community Support Workers with diverse degrees and qualifications [US Direct Support Professional Workforce].

Children's professionals in the field of mental health include inclusion educators (over $80,000 at the PhD level) who have been cross-educated in the fields, and "residential treatment" personnel who need dual reviews of credentials (child care, family support, child welfare, independent living, special education and home life, residential skills training programs).

=== Treatment diversity and community mental health ===
Mental health professionals exist to improve the mental health of individuals, couples, families and the community-at-large. [In this generic use, mental health is available to the entire population, similar to the use by mental health associations.] Because mental health covers a wide range of elements, the scope of practice greatly varies between professionals. Some professionals may enhance relationships while others treat specific mental disorders and illness; still, others work on population-based health promotion or prevention activities. Often, as with the case of psychiatrists and psychologists, the scope of practice may overlap due to common hiring and promotion practices by employers.

As indicated earlier, community mental health professionals are involved in the origination and operation of community programs which include ongoing efforts to improve life outcomes, including through long-term services and support (LTSS). Termed functional or competency-based programs, this service also stresses decision-making and self-determination or empowerment as critical aspects. Community mental health professionals may also serve children who have different needs, as do families, including family therapy, financial assistance and support services. Community mental health professionals serve people of all ages from young children with autism to children with emotional (or behavioral) needs to grandma who has Alzheimer's or dementia and is living at home after dad dies.

Most qualified mental health professionals will refer a patient or client to another professional if the specific type of treatment needed is outside of their scope of practice. The main community concern is "zero rejection" from community services for individuals who have been termed "hard to serve" in the population ["schizophrenia"] ["dual diagnosis"] or who have additional needs such as mobility and sensory impairments. Additionally, many mental health professionals may sometimes work together using a variety of treatment options such as concurrent psychiatric medication and psychotherapy and supported housing. Additionally, specific mental health professionals may be utilized based upon their cultural and religious background or experience, as part of a theory of both alternative medicines and of the nature of helping and ethnicity.

Primary care providers, such as internists, pediatricians, and family physicians, may provide initial components of mental health diagnosis and treatment for children and adults; however, family physicians in some states refuse to even prescribe a psychotropic medication deferring to separately funded "medication management" services. Community programs in the categorical field of mental health were designed (1970s) to have a personal family physician for every client in their programs, except for institutional settings and nursing facilities which have only one or two for a large facility (1980, 2013).

In particular, family physicians are trained during residency in interviewing and diagnostic skills, and may be quite skilled in managing conditions such as ADHD in children and depression in adults. Likewise, many (but not all) pediatricians may be taught the basic components of ADHD diagnosis and treatment during residency. In many other circumstances, primary care physicians may receive additional training and experience in mental health diagnosis and treatment during their practice years.

=== Relative effectiveness ===
Both primary care physicians (PCPs) (also known as General Practitioners (GP)) and psychiatrists are just as effective (in terms of remission rates) for the treatment of depression. However, treatment-resistant depression, suicidal, homicidal ideation, psychosis and catatonia should be handled by mental health specialists. Treatment-resistant depression (or treatment-refractory depression) refers to depression that remains at large after at least two antidepressant medications have been tried on their own.

=== Peer workers ===
Some think that mental health professionals are less credible when they have personal experience of mental health. In fact, the mental health sector goes out of its way to hire people with mental illness experience. Those in the mental health workforce with personal experience of mental health are referred to as 'peer support workers' or 'peer support specialists'. The balance of evidence appears to favor their employment: Randomized controlled trials consistently demonstrate peer staff produce outcomes on par with non-peer staff in ancillary roles, but they actually perform better in reducing hospitalization rates, engaging clients who are difficult to reach, and cutting substance use. There is research that indicates peer workers cultivate a perception among service users that the service is more responsive to non-treatment things, increases their hope, family satisfaction, self-esteem and community belonging.

== Psychiatrists ==
Psychiatrists are physicians and one of the few professionals in the mental health industry who specialize and are certified in treating mental illness using the biomedical approach to mental disorders including the use of medications. However, biological, genetic and social processes as part of premedicine have been the basis of education in fields such as other mental health training since the 1970s, and in 2013, such academic degrees also may include extensive work on the status of the brain, DNA research and its applications.

Psychiatrists may also go through significant training to conduct psychotherapy and cognitive behavioral therapy. The amount of training a psychiatrist holds in providing these types of therapies varies from program to program and also differs greatly based upon region. [Cognitive therapy also stems from cognitive rehabilitation techniques, and may involve long-term community clients with brain injuries seeking jobs, education and community housing.] In the 1970s, psychiatrists were considered to be hospital-based assessment and clinical education personnel which was not involved in establishing community programs.

=== Specialties of psychiatrists ===
As part of their evaluation of the patient, psychiatrists are one of only a few mental health professionals who may conduct physical examinations, order and interpret laboratory tests and EEGs, and may order brain imaging studies such as CT or CAT, MRI, and PET scanning. A medical professional must evaluate the patient for any medical problems or diseases that may be the cause of the mental illness.

Historically psychiatrists have been the only mental health professionals with the power to prescribe medication to treat specific types of mental illness. Currently, Physician Assistants respond to the psychiatrist (in lieu of and supervised) and advanced practice psychiatric nurses may prescribe medications, including psychiatric medications. Clinical psychologists have gained the ability to prescribe psychiatric medications on a limited basis in a few U.S. states after completing additional training and passing an examination.

=== Educational requirements for psychiatrists ===
Typically the requirements to become a psychiatrist are substantial but differ from country to country. In general there is an initial period of several years of academic and clinical training and supervised work in different areas of medicine, in order to become a licensed medical doctor, followed by several years of supervised work and study in psychiatry, in order to become a licensed psychiatrist.

In the United States and Canada one must first complete a Bachelor's degree. Students may typically decide any major subject of their choice, however they must enroll in specific courses, usually outlined in a pre-medical program. One must then apply to and attend 4 years of medical school in order to earn his MD or DO and to complete his medical education. Psychiatrists must then pass three successive rigorous national board exams (United States Medical Licensing Exams "USMLE", Steps 1, 2, and 3), which draws questions from all fields of medicine and surgery, before gaining an unrestricted license to practice medicine. Following this, the individual must complete a four-year residency in Psychiatry as a psychiatric resident and sit for annual national in-service exams. Psychiatry residents are required to complete at least four post-graduate months of internal medicine (pediatrics may be substituted for some or all of the internal medicine months for those planning to specialize in child and adolescent psychiatry) and two months of neurology, usually during the first year, but some programs require more. Occasionally, some prospective psychiatry residents will choose to do a transitional year internship in medicine or general surgery, in which case they may complete the two months of neurology later in their residency. After completing their training, psychiatrists take written and then oral specialty board examinations. The total amount of time required to qualify in the field of psychiatry in the United States is typically 4 to 5 years after obtaining the MD or DO (or in total 8 to 9 years minimum). Many psychiatrists pursue an additional 1–2 years in subspecialty fellowships on top of this such as child psychiatry, geriatric psychiatry, and psychosomatic medicine.

In the United Kingdom, the Republic of Ireland, and most Commonwealth countries, the initial degree is the combined Bachelor of Medicine and Bachelor of Surgery, usually a single period of academic and clinical study lasting around five years. This degree is most often abbreviated 'MBChB', 'MB BS' or other variations, and is the equivalent of the American 'MD'. Following this the individual must complete a two-year foundation programmer that mainly consists of supervised paid work as a Foundation House Officer within different specialties of medicine. Upon completion the individual can apply for "core specialist training" in psychiatry, which mainly involves supervised paid work as a Specialty Registrar in different subspecialties of psychiatry. After three years there is an examination for Membership of the Royal College of Psychiatrists (abbreviated MRCPsych), with which an individual may then work as a "Staff grade" or "Associate Specialist" psychiatrist, or pursue an academic psychiatry route via a PhD. If, after the MRCPsych, an additional 3 years of specialization known as "advanced specialist training" are taken (again mainly paid work), and a Certificate of Completion of Training is awarded, the individual can apply for a post taking independent clinical responsibility as a "consultant" psychiatrist.

== Clinical psychologists ==
A clinical psychologist studies and applies psychology for the purpose of understanding, preventing and relieving psychologically based distress or dysfunction and to promote subjective well-being and personal development. In many countries it is a regulated profession that addresses moderate to more severe or chronic psychological problems, including diagnosable mental disorders. Clinical psychology includes a wide range of practices, such as research, psychological assessment, teaching, consultation, forensic testimony, and program development and administration. Central to clinical psychology is the practice of psychotherapy, which uses a wide range of techniques to change thoughts, feelings, or behaviors in service to enhancing subjective well-being, mental health, and life functioning. Unlike other mental health professionals, psychologists are trained to conduct psychological assessment. Clinical psychologists can work with individuals, couples, children, older adults, families, small groups, and communities.

=== Specialties of clinical psychologists ===
Clinical psychologists who focus on treating mental health specializes in evaluating patients and providing psychotherapy. They do not prescribe medication as this is the role of a psychiatrist (physician who specializes in psychiatry). There are a wide variety of therapeutic techniques and perspectives that guide practitioners, although most fall into the major categories of Psychodynamic, Cognitive Behavioral, Existential-Humanistic, and Systems Therapy (e.g. family or couples therapy).

In addition to therapy, clinical psychologists are also trained to administer and interpret psychological personality tests such as the MCMI, MMPI and the Rorschach inkblot test, and various standardized tests of intelligence, memory, and neuropsychological functioning. Common areas of specialization include: specific disorders (e.g. trauma), neuropsychological disorders, child and adolescent, family and relationship counseling. Internationally, psychologists are generally not granted prescription privileges. In the US, prescriptive rights have been granted to appropriately trained psychologists only in the states of New Mexico and Louisiana, with some limited prescriptive rights in Indiana and the US territory of Guam.

=== Educational requirements for clinical psychologists ===
Clinical psychologists, having completed an undergraduate degree usually in psychology or other social science, generally undergo specialist postgraduate training lasting at least two years (e.g. Australia), three years (e.g. UK), or four to six years depending on how much research activity is included in the course (e.g. US). In countries where the course is of shorter duration, there may be an informal requirement for applicants to have undertaken prior work experience supervised by a clinical psychologist, and a proportion of applicants may also undertake a separate PhD research degree.

Today, in the U.S., about half of licensed psychologists are trained in the Scientist-Practitioner Model of Clinical Psychology (PhD)—a model that emphasizes both research and clinical practice and is usually housed in universities. The other half are being trained within a Practitioner-Scholar Model of Clinical Psychology (PsyD), which focuses on practice. A third training model called the Clinical Scientist Model emphasizes training in clinical psychology research. Outside of coursework, graduates of both programs generally are required to have had 2 to 3 years of supervised clinical experience, a certain amount of personal psychotherapy, and the completion of a dissertation (PhD programs usually require original quantitative empirical research, whereas the PsyD equivalent of dissertation research often consists of literature review and qualitative research, theoretical scholarship, program evaluation or development, critical literature analysis, or clinical application and analysis).

=== Continuing education requirements for clinical psychologists ===
Most states in the US require clinical psychologists to obtain a certain number of continuing education credits in order to renew their license. This was established to ensure that psychologists stay current with information and practices in their fields. The license renewal cycle varies, but renewal is generally required every two years.

The number of continuing education credits required for clinical psychologists varies between states. In Nebraska, psychologists are required to obtain 24 hours of approved continuing education credits in the 24 months before their license renewal. In California, the requirement is for 36 hours of credits. New York State does not have any continuing education requirements for license renewal at this time (2014).

Activities that count towards continuing education credits generally include completing courses, publishing research papers, teaching classes, home study, and attending workshops. Some states require that a certain number of the continuing education credits be in ethics. Most states allow psychologists to self-report their credits but randomly audit individual psychologists to ensure compliance.

== Counseling psychologist or psychotherapist ==
Counseling generally involves helping people with what might be considered "normal" or "moderate" psychological problems, such as feelings of anxiety or sadness resulting from major life changes or events. As such, counseling psychologists often help people adjust to or cope with their environment or major events, although many also work with more serious problems as well.

One may practice as a counseling psychologist with a PhD or EdD, and as a counseling psychotherapist with a master's degree. Compared with clinical psychology, there are fewer counseling psychology graduate programs (which are commonly housed in departments of education), counselors tend to conduct more vocational assessment and less projective or objective assessment, and they are more likely to work in public service or university clinics (rather than hospitals or private practice). Despite these differences, there is considerable overlap between the two fields and distinctions between them continue to fade.

Mental health counselors and residential counselors are also the name for another class of counselors or mental health professionals who may work with long-term services and supports (LTSS) clients in the community. Such counselors may be advanced or senior staff members in a community program, and may be involved in developing skill-teaching, active listening (and similar psychological and educational methods), and community participation programs. They also are often skilled in on-site intervention, redirection and emergency techniques. Supervisory personnel often advance from this class of workers in community programs.

== Behavior analysts and community/institutional roles ==
Behavior analysts are licensed in five states to provide services for clients with substance abuse, developmental disabilities, and mental illness. This profession draws on the evidence base of applied behavior analysis, behavior therapy, and the philosophy of radical behaviorism. Behavior analysts have at least a master's degree in behavior analysis or in a mental health-related discipline as well as at least five core courses in applied behavior analysis (narrow focus in psychological education). Many behavior analysts have a doctorate. Most programs have a formalized internship program and several programs are offered online. Most practitioners have passed the examination offered by the behavior analysis certification board. The model licensing act for behavior analysts can be found at the Association for Behavior Analysis International's website.

Behavior analysts (who grew from the definition of mental health as a behavioral problem) often use community situational activities, life events, functional teaching, community "reinforcers", family and community staff as intervenors, and structured interventions as the base in which they may be called upon to provide skilled professional assistance. Approaches that are based upon person-centered approaches have been used to update the stricter, hospital-based interventions used by behavior analysts for applicability to community environments Behavioral approaches have often been infused with efforts at client self-determination, have been aligned with community lifestyle planning, and have been criticized as "aversive technology" which was "outlawed" in the field of severe disabilities in the 1990s.

== School psychologist and inclusion educators ==
School psychologists' primary concern is with the academic, social, and emotional well-being of children within a scholastic environment. Unlike clinical psychologists, they receive much more training in education, child development and behavior, and the psychology of learning, often graduating with a post-master's educational specialist degree (EdS), EdD or Doctor of Philosophy (PhD) degree. Besides offering individual and group therapy with children and their families, school psychologists also evaluate school programs, provide cognitive assessment, help design prevention programs (e.g. reducing dropouts), and work with teachers and administrators to help maximize teaching efficacy, both in the classroom and systemically.

In today's world, the school psychologist remains the responsible party in "mental health" regarding children with emotional and behavioral needs, and has not always met these needs in the regular school environment. Inclusion (special) educators support participation in local school programs and after-school programs, including new initiatives such as Achieve my Plan by the Research and Training Center on Family Support and Children's Mental Health at Portland State University. Referrals to residential schools and certification of the personnel involved in the residential schools and campuses have been a multi-decade concern with counties often involved in national efforts to better support these children and youth in local schools, families, homes and communities.

== Psychiatric rehabilitation ==
Psychiatric rehabilitation, similar to cognitive rehabilitation, is a designated field in the rehabilitation often academically prepared in either Schools of Allied Health and Sciences (near the field of Physical Medicine and Rehabilitation) and as rehabilitation counseling in the School of Education. Both have been developed specifically to prepare community personnel (at the MA and PHD levels) and to aid in the transition to professionally competent and integrated community services. Psychiatric rehabilitation personnel have a community integration-related base, support a recovery and skills-based model of mental health, and may be involved with community programs based upon normalization and social role valorization throughout the US. Psychiatric rehabilitation personnel have been involved in upgrading the skills of staff in institutions in order to move clients into community settings. Most common in international fields are community rehabilitation personnel who traditionally come from the rehabilitation counseling or community fields. In the new "rehabilitation centers" (new campus buildings), designed similar to hospital "rehab" (physical and occupational therapy, sports medicine), often no designated personnel are in the fields of mental health (now "senior behavioral services" or "residential treatment units"). Psychiatric rehabilitation textbooks are currently on the market describing the community services their personnel were involved in community development (commonly known as deinstitutionalization).

Psychiatric rehabilitation professionals (and psychosocial services) are the mainstay of community programs in the US, and the national service providers association itself may certify mental health staff in these areas. Psychiatric interventions which vary from behavioral ones are described in a review on their use in "residential, vocational, social or educational role functioning" as a "preferred methods for helping individuals with serious psychiatric disabilities". Other competencies in education may involve working with families, user-directed planning methods and financing, housing and support, personal assistance services, transitional or supported employment, Americans with Disabilities Act (ADA), supported housing, integrated approaches (e.g., substance use, or intellectual disabilities), and psychosocial interventions, among others. In addition, rehabilitation counselors (PhD, MS) may also be educated "generically" (breadth and depth) or for all diagnostic groups, and can work in these fields; other personnel may have certifications in areas such as supported employment which has been verified for use in psychiatric, neurological, traumatic brain injury, and intellectual disabilities, among others.

== Social worker ==
Social workers in the area of mental health may assess, treat, develop treatment plans, provide case management and/or rights advocacy to individuals with mental health problems. They can work independently or within clinics/service agencies, usually in collaboration with other health care professionals.

In the US, they are often referred to as clinical social workers; each state specifies the responsibilities and limitations of this profession. State licensing boards and national certification boards require clinical social workers to have a master's or doctoral degree (MSW or DSW/PhD) from a university. The doctorate in social work requires submission of a major original contribution to the field to be awarded the degree.

In the UK, there is now a standardized three-year undergraduate social work degree, or a two-year postgraduate master's for those who already have an undergraduate social sciences degree or other relevant work experience. These courses include mandatory supervised work experience in social work, which may include mental health services. Successful completion allows an individual to register and work as a qualified social worker. There are various additional optional courses for gaining qualifications specific to mental health, for example training in psychotherapy or, in England and Wales, for the role of Approved Mental Health Professional (two years' training for a legal role in the assessment and detention of eligible mentally disordered people under the Mental Health Act (1983) as amended in 2007).

Social workers in England and Wales are now able to become Approved Clinicians (AC) under the Mental Health Act 2007 following a period of further training (likely at postgraduate degree/diploma or doctoral level). Historically, this role was reserved for psychiatrist medical doctors, but has now extended to registered mental health professionals, such as social workers, psychologists and mental health nurses.

In general, it is the psycho-social model rather than, or in addition to, the dominant medical model, that is the underlying rationale for mental health social work. This may include a focus on social causation, labeling, critical theory and social constructiveness. Many argue social workers need to work with medical and health colleagues to provide an effective service but they also need to be at the forefront of processes that include and empower service users.

Social workers also prepare social work administration and may hold positions in human services systems as administration or Executives to Administration in the US. Social workers, similar to psychiatric rehabilitation, updates its professional education programs based upon current developments in the fields (e.g., support services) and serve a multicultural client base.

=== Educational requirements for social workers ===
In the United States, the minimum requirement for social workers is generally a bachelor's degree in social work, though a bachelor's degree in a related field such as sociology or psychology may qualify an applicant for certain jobs. Higher-level jobs typically require a master's degree in social work. Master's programs in social work usually last two years and consist of at least 900 hours of supervised instruction in the field. Regulatory boards generally require that degrees be obtained from programs that are accredited by the Council of Social Work Education (CSWE) or another nationally recognized accrediting agency for promotion and future collaboration.

Before social workers can practice, they are required to meet the licensing, certification, or registration requirements of the state. The requirements vary depending on the state but usually involve a minimum number of supervised hours in the field and passing an exam. All states except California also require pre-licensure from the Association of Social Work Boards (ASWB).

The ASWB offers four categories of social work license. The lowest level is a Bachelor's, for which a bachelor's degree in social work is required. The next level up is a Master's and a master's degree in social work is required. The Advanced Generalist category of social worker requires a master's degree in social work and two years of supervised post-degree experience. The highest ASWB category is a Clinical Social Worker which requires a master's degree in social work along with two years of post-master's direct experience in social work.

=== Continuing education requirements for social workers ===
Most states require social workers to acquire a minimum number of continuing education credits per license, certification, or registration renewal period. The purpose of these requirements is to ensure that social workers stay up-to-date with information and practices in their professions. In most states, the renewal process occurs every two or three years. The number of continuing education credits that is required varies between states but is generally 20 to 45 hours during the two- or three-year period before renewal.

Courses and programs that are approved as continuing education for social workers generally must be relevant to the profession and contribute to the advancement of professional competence. They often include continuing education courses, seminars, training programs, community service, research, publishing articles, or serving on a panel. Many states enforce that a minimum amount of the credits be on topics such as ethics, HIV/AIDs, or domestic violence.

== Psychiatric and mental health nurse ==
Psychiatric Nurses or Mental Health Nurse Practitioners work with people with a large variety of mental health problems, often at the time of highest distress, and usually within hospital settings. These professionals work in primary care facilities, outpatient mental health clinics, as well as in hospitals and community health centers. MHNPs evaluate and provide care for patients who have anything from psychiatric disorders, medical mental conditions, to substance abuse problems. They are licensed to provide emergency psychiatric services, assess the psycho-social and physical state of their patients, create treatment plans, and continually manage their care. They may also serve as consultants or as educators for families and staff; however, the MHNP has a greater focus on psychiatric diagnosis (typically the province of the MD or PhD), including the differential diagnosis of medical disorders with psychiatric symptoms and on medication treatment for psychiatric disorders.

=== Educational requirements for psychiatric and mental health nurses ===
Psychiatric and mental health nurses receive specialist education to work in this area. In some countries, it is required that a full course of general nurse training be completed before specializing as a psychiatric nurse. In other countries, such as the U.K., an individual completes a specific nurse training course that determines their area of work. As with other areas of nursing, it is becoming usual for psychiatric nurses to be educated to degree level and beyond. Psychiatric aides, now being trained by educational psychology in 2014, are part of the entry-level workforce which is projected to be needed in communities in the US in the next decades.

To become a nurse practitioner in the U.S., at least six years of college education must be obtained. After earning the bachelor's degree (usually in nursing, although there are master's entry-level nursing graduate programs intended for individuals with a bachelor's degree outside of nursing) the test for a license as a registered nurse (the NCLEX-RN) must be passed. Next, the candidate must complete a state-approved master's degree advanced nursing education program which includes at least 600 clinical hours. Several schools are now also offering further education and awarding a DNP (Doctor of Nursing Practice).

Individuals who choose a master's entry-level pathway will spend an extra year at the start of the program taking classes necessary to pass the NCLEX-RN. Some schools will issue a BSN; others will issue a certificate. The student then continues with the normal MSN program.

== Mental health care navigator ==
A mental health care navigator is an individual who assists patients and families to find appropriate mental health caregivers, facilities and services. Individuals who are care navigators are often also trained therapists and doctors. The need for mental health care navigators arises from the fragmentation of the mental health industry, which can often leave those in need with more questions than answers. Care navigators work closely with patients through discussion and collaboration to provide information on options and referrals to healthcare professionals, facilities, and organizations specializing in the patients' needs. The difference between other mental health professionals and a care navigator is that a care navigator provides information and directs a patient to the best help rather than offering diagnosis, prescription of medications or treatment.

Many mental health organizations use "navigator" and "navigation" to describe the service of providing guidance through the health care industry. Care navigators are also sometimes referred to as "system navigators". One type of care navigator is an "educational consultant".

== Workforce shortage ==
Behavioral health disorders are prevalent in the United States, but accessing treatment can be challenging. Nearly 1 in 5 adults experience a mental health condition for which approximately only 43% received treatment. When asked about access to mental health treatment, two-thirds of primary care physicians reported that they were unable to secure outpatient mental health treatment for their patients. This is due, in part, to the workforce shortage in behavioral health. In rural areas, 55% of US counties have no practicing psychiatrist, psychologist, or social worker. Overall, 77% of counties have a severe shortage of mental health workers and 96% of counties had some unmet need. Some of the reasons for the workforce shortage include high turnover rates, high levels of work-related stress, and inadequate compensation. The annual turnover rate is 33% for clinicians and 23% for clinical supervisors. This is compared to an annual PCP turnover rate of 7.1%. Compensation in the behavioral health field is notably low. The average licensed clinical social worker, a position that requires a master's degree and 2000 hours of post-graduate experience, earns $45,000/year. As a point of reference, the average physical therapist earns $75,000/year. Substance abuse counselor earnings are even lower, with an average salary of $34,000/year. Job stress is another factor that may lead to the high turnover rates and workforce shortage. It is estimated that 21-67% of mental health workers experience high levels of burnout including symptoms of emotional exhaustion, high levels of depersonalization and a reduced sense of personal accomplishment. Researchers have offered various recommendations to reduce the critical workforce gaps in behavioral health. Some of these recommendations include the following: expanding loan repayment programs to incentivize mental health providers to work in underserved (often rural) areas, integrating mental health into primary care, and increasing reimbursement to health care professionals.

Social workers also tend to experience competing work and family demands, which negatively affect their job well-being and subsequently their job satisfaction, resulting in high turnover in the profession.

== See also ==
- Community integration
- Community Psychology
  - Clinical Psychology
  - List of credentials in psychology
  - Psychologist
  - Psychotherapy
  - Clinical Associate (Psychology)
- Global mental health
- Health care providers
- Inclusion (education)
- Mental health
- Mental illness
- Psychiatric rehabilitation
- Psychiatry
  - Anti-psychiatry
- List of counseling topics
- Supported housing
