= Association for the Behavioral Sciences and Medical Education =

Organization

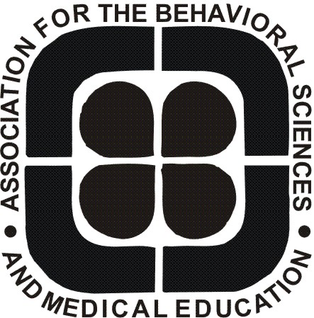
- Logo of ABSAME
- Formation: 1975
- Dissolved: 2017
- Headquarters: Burton, MI, United States

The Association for the Behavioral Sciences and Medical Education (ABSAME) was founded in 1975 as an interdisciplinary professional society dedicated to strengthening behavioral science teaching in medical schools, residency programs, and in continuing medical education. ABSAME traces its origins to four invitational conferences sponsored by the National Institutes of Health in 1969 and 1970. This group concluded their operations in 2017.

The group of physicians and behavioral scientists who made up this association were originally assembled through a program initiated and funded by the National Institute of Child Health and Human Development. Dr. Richard Olmsted (then Chairman of Pediatrics at the University of Oregon) was instrumental in planning and organizing the first conference on behavioral sciences and medical education held in the Allenberry Inn, Boiling Springs, PA. Approximately 20 physicians and 30 behavioral scientists from various disciplines attended. The need to continue was obvious to all. Between May 1969 and November 1970, four conferences were held, three of which were supported by the NICHD. The third conference was supported by the Division of Physician manpower at NIH. On December 9, 1975, ABSAME became legally incorporated in the Commonwealth of Pennsylvania.

The ABSAME mission statement was to:

- To promote the application of social and behavioral science knowledge, skill and perspectives in the education and training of physicians, nurses, and other professionals working in the field of health.
- To improve the effectiveness, efficiency, and quality of health care through the application of social and behavioral science knowledge, skills and perspectives.
- To encourage the improvement of educational and training practices in the preparation of physicians, nurses, and other health professional.
- To aid in the continuing education of teachers, clinicians, researchers and administrators involved in carrying out the above activities.

The core of ABSAME's membership consisted of physicians and non-physician behavioral scientists whose primary interest lies in enhancing behavioral science teaching at all levels. ABSAME also welcomed membership from faculty members and students in schools of dentistry, public health, nursing, and allied health, as well as medical students, house staff, and graduate students in the behavioral sciences. The organization placed an emphasis on interdisciplinary teaching and colleagueship in the education of health professional.

== Publications ==
- Annals of Behavioral Science and Medical Education —a peer-reviewed journal that contains original articles with regular sections on Behavioral Science Teaching Rounds, Abstracts and Journal Watch, Book Reviews, and Communications.
- Progress Notes—a newsletters for members

== See also ==
- Behavioral sciences
- Primary Care Behavioral Health
