= Primary care psychologist =

A Primary care psychologist (PCP) is a psychologist with specialist training in psychological knowledge and principles of common physical diseases and mental disorders experienced by patients and families throughout the lifespan, and which tend to present in primary care clinics.

== Scotland ==
Clinical associates in applied psychology are a related "New Ways of Working" initiative in Scotland.

== United Kingdom ==
Most recently, the UK Improving Access to Psychological Therapies (IAPT) initiative, which focuses on primary care psychological therapies provision, has benchmarked professionals at all career levels, from closely supervised psychological wellbeing practitioners (many of which have a psychology undergraduate degree and a post-graduate one year certificate/diploma, although several have master's degrees too) to high-intensity psychological therapists, who, in terms of pay, are benchmarked against doctorate level training (many of these are counselling psychologists and clinical psychologists). Moreover, Clinical lead posts are pivotal in leading related primary care psychological services and these are benchmarked against Consultant Psychologist level (post doctoral expertise).

== See also ==
- Doctor of Clinical Psychology
