= Better Futures Minnesota =

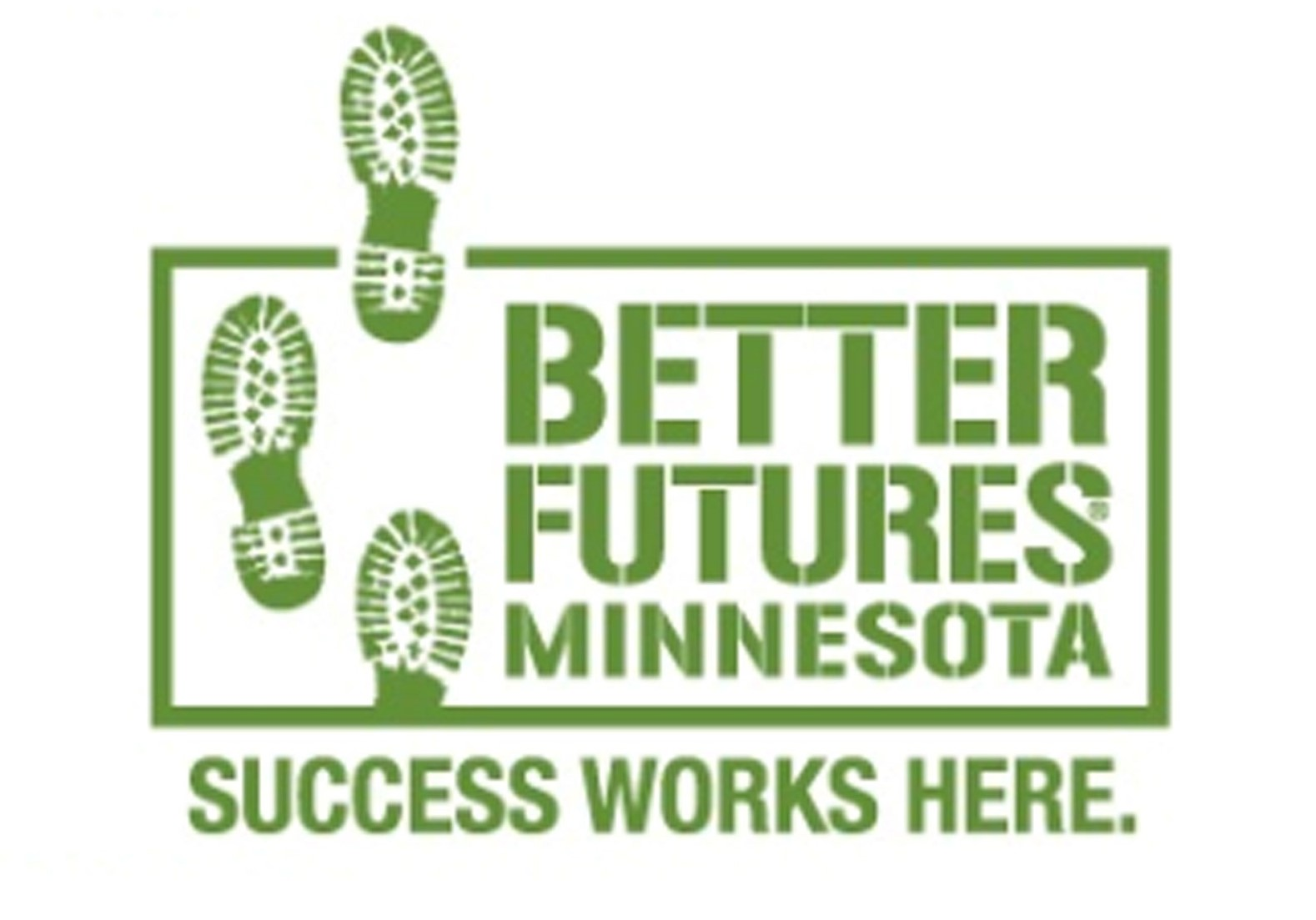
- Founded: 2007
- Purpose: Employment, Ending recidivism
- Location: 2620 Minnehaha Ave, Minneapolis, Minnesota
- Region served: Twin Cities, Minnesota
- Method: Business Revenue, Donations and Grants
- Website: betterfuturesminnesota.com
- Formerly called: The Network for Better Futures

The Network for Better Futures d/b/a Better Futures Minnesota is a non-profit social enterprise based in Minneapolis, Minnesota, dedicated to reintegrating high-risk adults, primarily African-American men, into society by providing a platform to help them succeed. The agency works with men with histories of incarceration, substance abuse, chronic unemployment, and homelessness—men who have a high risk of being repeat offenders.

== History ==
A group of health and human service agencies in the Twin Cities, MN region founded The Network for Better Futures in 2007. The NetWork was created to provide holistic support on health, behavior, housing, employment, social issues to high risk men., and it now does business as Better Futures Minnesota. In 2007 the Minnesota legislature selected the organization to administer a state demonstration pilot project.

== Funding ==
Better Futures received a grant for $2.8 million from the Robert Wood Johnson Foundation (RWJF) in 2007. In February 2011, RWJF approved an additional $3.5 million grant through February 2014, Minnesota Governor Mark Dayton proposed a $3 million appropriation for the organization's pilot program for FY 2012-2013, but budget cuts to the Office of Justice Programs in July 2011 limited this funding.

== Model ==
The organization, together with its seven sponsoring groups, offers high-risk men access to five core services immediately after leaving incarceration: affordable housing, behavioral health services, primary health care, work opportunities and a community setting.

The organization works to keep its men out of prison and off of social services while having them work their way back into mainstream society. Participants must stay crime-free and promptly begin paying child support and rent, which is temporarily subsidized. To prepare them for returning to the general public, all participants in Better Futures attend community building sessions where they engage with peers and develop accountability

The goals of this model include reducing use of state-funded health care and criminal justice services, increasing public safety and reducing criminal activity, producing better physical, mental and behavioral health, achieving cost-effective results from public dollars, increasing economic activity among a population associated with using tax-payer services, helping participants contribute to the healing and rebuilding of their communities and families and integrating reform services and financing for high-risk people

== Partners ==
In order to supply participants access to health, housing, training, and prevention resources under one program, Better Futures works with seven sponsoring organizations

- Summit Academy OIC and Twin Cities RISE provide job training
- Turning Point and R.S. Eden provide substance abuse treatment
- Northpoint Health and Wellness Center provides health care
- Family Housing Fund is the affordable housing funder and advocate

== Better Futures Enterprise ==
Better Futures Enterprise is a business model within Better Futures Minnesota's program. It employs participants and provides work crews to businesses in the Twin Cities metropolitan area. Better Futures creates work crews for the men and charges customers for services such as recycling, demolition, groundskeeping, refurbishing household goods and building maintenance. The men receive a subsistence wage that goes toward paying taxes and rent

== Lines of Business ==
- Deconstruction (building)
- Property Maintenance
- Janitorial
- Appliance Recycling
- ReUse Warehouse

ReUse Warehouse keep more than 700 tons of building materials out of Minnesota landfills in 2015. It is located at 2620 Minnehaha Avenue in South Minneapolis. The warehouse opens to the public on Tuesday to Friday 11 am – 7pm and Saturday 9 am – 2 pm.

== Evaluation ==
Over a 30-month period, Better Futures served 400 men, and through their work, the men generated $3 in benefits for the community for every $1 invested in the program. In three years, 91 percent of Better Futures' participants have not re-offended.
