= Blood Family Mafia =

Québécoise gang allied with the Bloods

- Founded: 2006
- Years active: 2006-Present
- Territory: Quebec City, Côte-Nord, Chaudière-Appalaches and Montreal
- Ethnicity: French Canadians, Québécois, Haitian Canadians
- Leaders: Dave "Pik" Turmel; All Boivin; Nathaniel Bernard (alleged acting boss)
- Activities: Drug trafficking, homicide, assault, torture, intimidation
- Rivals: Hells Angels

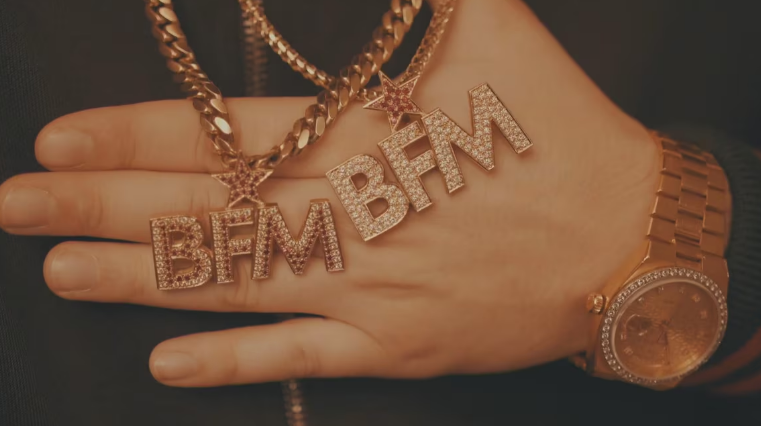

The Blood Family Mafia, often abbreviated to BFM, is a Canadian street gang active in Quebec.

== Origins ==
The gang was founded in 2006 and is mostly active in the St. Lawrence river valley with a strong focus in Quebec City area, the Côte-Nord area and the Chaudière-Appalaches. A gang with the same name was founded in the northern end of Montreal by a Haitian immigrant Valdano Toussaint who was ordered deported back to Haiti in 2008. The style of the BFM is closely modelled after the Bloods gang of Los Angeles. The same gang name was once used by a Haitian-Canadian gang, but is now used by a gang, largely French Canadian.

== Conflict with the Hells Angels ==
The BFM traditionally paid a 10% "tax" to the Hells Angels, but in 2023 the group came into conflict with the Hells Angels after it ceased paying the "tax". Criminologist Maria Mourani stated in a 2024 interview: "They never liked working for the Hells Angels". The current leader of the BFM is said by the police to be David "Pic" Turmel. Turmel is a 27-year-old man, living in self-imposed exile in Lisbon. The journalist Félix Séguin said of him: "Dave Turmel, 27, is a young man who, even as a teenager, was described as ultra violent. In recent years, he decided to attack the Hells Angels of the Quebec chapter head-on. He and his gang, the Blood Family Mafia, refuse to pay taxes that the Hells charge throughout the province, to authorize independent groups to sell drugs on their territory. Very rare thing, in the case of Quebec, the Hells do not retaliate...They are even negotiating a truce."

The BFM has modelled its tactics after the maras of Central America, and routinely engages in torture, which has led the gang to be considered one of the most violent in Quebec. Mourani said of the gang's use of torture: "It's not something that is common in Quebec's street gangs. Is this a new way of doing business? We'll see." The gang is alleged to have released videos on the internet showing them torturing Hells Angels. In February 2024, members of the BFM were arrested by the Sûreté du Québec in connection with the kidnapping, torture and murder of a man in Saint-Malachie. The Sûreté du Québec stated that the victim was not associated with the Hells Angels. The man was subjected to what the Quebec media called "a night of horror" with his body being burned and his ears cut off. The victim was reported to be a drug dealer who decided to cease working for the BFM and was invited to attend a fare-well party. The victim was beaten several times and subjected to waterboarding three times before his feet were burned.

The attacks of the BFM on the Quebec City chapter of the Hells Angels are said to have badly damaged the image of the Hells Angels in the Canadian underworld along with the contrast between the youthful leaders of the BFM vs. the elderly leaders of the Hells Angels. The journalist Pascal Robdidas reported that the BFM is leading a "rebellion" by various street level drug dealers who have grown tired of paying the exorbitant "taxes" to the Hells Angels in exchange for the privilege of being allowed to sell drugs. The Hells Angels are reported to have formed "baseball teams" to go out and beat up various drug dealers in the regions of Quebec to stop them from defecting over to the BFM.

== Police crackdown ==
Roobens Denis, the deputy leader of the BFM, was arrested on 1 March 2024 in Portugal following an extradition request from Canada. On 30 June 2024, another BFM leader, Guillaume St-Louis Bernier, was arrested in Kelowna by the Royal Canadian Mounted Police following an extradition request from Quebec to British Columbia.

Jimmy Chiasson, Jérémy Chiasson, Jean-Samuel Chiasson, Mathieu Bouchard and Éliane Dinet were arrested for drug trafficking. Stéphane Hébert, 32, Zachary Gagnon, 21, and Ghislain Grenier, 54, are expected to face charges of attempted murder and aggravated assault for the event that occurred in La Baie, Saguenay, on April 15.

Dave "Pik" Turmel, the alleged leader of the gang, was arrested in Italy after being on the run for over a year as Canada's number one fugitive.
