= Primary care behavioral health =

Psychological approach to population-based clinical health care

The primary care behavioral health (PCBH) consultation model is a psychological approach to population-based clinical health care that is simultaneously co-located, collaborative, and integrated within the primary care clinic. The goal of PCBH is to improve and promote overall health within the general population. This approach is important because approximately half of all patients in primary care present with psychiatric comorbidities, and 60% of psychiatric illness is treated in primary care.

Primary care practice has traditionally adopted a generalist approach whereby physicians are trained in the medical model and solutions to problems typically involve medications, procedures, and advice. Appointment times are short, with the goal of seeing a large number of patients in a day. Many patients present with behavioral health care needs that may overlap with medical disorders and that may exacerbate, complicate, or masquerade as physical symptoms. In addition, many medical problems present with associated psychological sequelae (such as stress, emotional reactions, dysfunctional lifestyle behaviors), that are amenable to change through behavioral interventions that can improve outcomes for these health problems.

The PCBH model enables early identification and behavioral/medical intervention that can prevent some acute problems from becoming chronic health care problems (such as chronic pain, diabetes, COPD, hypertension, obesity), which are the cause of many medical visits to primary care clinics. Behavioral health consultants (BHCs) work side-by-side with all members of the clinical care team (including primary care providers (PCPs) and nursing staff) to enhance preventive and clinical care for mental health problems that have traditionally been treated solely by physicians. The role of the BHC is to facilitate systemic change within primary care that facilitates a multidisciplinary approach both from a treatment and reimbursement standpoint. BHCs typically collaborate with physicians to develop treatment plans, monitor patient progress, and flexibly provide care to meet patients' changing needs. Moreover, the integrated care model increases behavioral health accessibility, fosters communication between patients and their primary care team, and improves patients' experiences receiving primary care.

== Associated terms ==
Primary care psychology
Provision of clinical mental health services through a population-based focus on the common problems confronting a majority of individuals. Such issues treated in primary care may include response to physical illness, stress, affective concerns, substance use and abuse, and developmental and situational issues among others. Primary care psychologists are co-located with primary care providers and usually share the same physical space in practice. Primary care psychologists may retain the traditional session length of specialty care or may adhere to a brief, consultative approach that is solution-focused. Primary care psychologists may often be trained in health psychology programs, but not exclusively so.

Behavioral health consultant
Behavioral health consultants and primary care physicians collaborate within the same system. The behavioral health provider works as part of the medical team to meet the wide range of needs with which patients present.

Collaborative care
This model uses databases or what are known as registries to track and monitor patients with certain conditions. Typical examples in primary care include diabetes and depression. Often the person managing the registry is a nurse or mental health professional who performs follow-up phone calls and assists the primary care team in following evidence-based protocols. There is often also a consulting psychiatrist who oversees the provision of care in primary care.

== Rationale ==
Primary care has often been termed the de facto mental health system in the United States. Research shows that approximately half of all mental health care services are provided solely by primary care providers. Furthermore, primary care practitioners prescribe about 70% of all psychotropic medications and 80% of antidepressants. Thus, while it seems there are various "specialty" mental health clinics and psychiatrists alike, the primary care environment continues to lend itself to an array of psychiatric issues. One reason is that physical health problems can contribute to psychological dysfunction and vice versa. Examples of the frequent comorbity between medical and psychological problems include: chronic pain can cause depression; panic symptoms can lead to complaints of heart palpitations; and stress can contribute to irritable bowl syndrome. While these mind-body relationships may seem obvious, often the presenting problem is far less clear, with the physical health problem being masked by psychosocial concerns. In fact, of the 10 most common complaints in primary care, less than 16% had a diagnosable physical etiology. The psychosocial impact on primary care is tremendous (approximately 70% of all visits); however, it is curious that few mental health providers have traditionally placed themselves where the demand for their services is arguably the greatest.

Despite the availability of outpatient mental health resources, research indicates that patients are still driven to the primary care setting. In fact, studies show that as little as 10% of patients actually follow through when being referred by a physician to receive outpatient mental health treatment. Many experts believe this low completion rate is tied to the stigma that often surrounds mental health care, causing patients to deny or refuse to seek help for psychiatric needs. As a general rule, patients who do choose to address their mental health concerns express a preference for services in primary care likely due to its familiarity and less stigmatizing environment. However, as many medical providers will admit, their training has left them ill-prepared to appropriately treat the psychiatric sequalae that presents in their clinic. The PCBH model has sought to address this dilemma by providing access to mental health services on site to more effectively target the biological, psychological, and social aspects of patient care. Resulting from close collaboration between physicians and mental health providers, the patients' needs are more adequately met by care that is more comprehensive and collaborative between physicians and mental health providers. Furthermore, the patients are more likely to follow through with primary care services, with referral rates around 80–90%.

== The behavioral health consultant model ==
Behavioral health consultants are culturally competent generalists who provide treatment for a wide variety of mental health, psychosocial, motivational, and medical concerns, including management of anxiety, depression, substance abuse, smoking cessation, sleep hygiene, and diabetes among others. BHCs also provide support and management for patients with severe and persistent mental illness and tend to be familiar with psychopharmacological interventions. Paralleling general medicine, patients who require more extensive mental health treatment are typically referred to specialty care. BHC appointments are typically 15–30 minutes long with the goal of utilizing brief interventions to reduce functional impairment for the population as a whole. BHCs tend to provide focused feedback to PCPs with succinct, action oriented recommendations to help effectively manage patients' needs. BHC interventions tend to be more cost effective and offer increased access to care, with improved patient and provider satisfaction.

=== Evidence base ===
A comparison of an enhanced-referral system to a BHC model found that more than 80% of medical providers rated communication between themselves and the BHC as occurring "frequently," relative to less than 50% in an enhanced-referral model of care. Providers strongly preferred an integrated care model to the enhanced-referral model. Another single-site study at an urban community health center found that embedding BHCs resulted in reduced referrals to specialty mental health (8% of depressed patients were referred) along with improved adherence to evidence-based guidelines for the care of depression and reduced prescriptions for antidepressants. Moreover, a recent literature review revealed that improved outcomes in mental health care were associated with several fundamental characteristics, including collaboration and co-location with PCP and mental health providers, as well as systematic follow-up, medication compliance, patient psycho-education, and patient input into treatment modality. In general the number of empirical investigations that have examined the clinical impact and cost-offset of the BHC model is still limited, although a growing body of evidence supports the utility of other integrated behavior health programs (with varying degrees of integration) in academic settings, Veterans Affairs Medical Centers, and community health care settings. A 2011 Cochrane review found that counselling in primary care settings resulted in significantly greater clinical effectiveness in short term mental health outcomes compared to usual care but provided no longer term benefits. Since all of the studies reviewed were from the United Kingdom, how well these findings can be generalized to other settings is unknown.

==== Depression care ====
Specifically targeting depression, Schulberg, Raue, & Rollman (2002) reviewed 12 randomized controlled trials (RCTs) that examined evidence-based treatments for major depression (interpersonal psychotherapy & cognitive-behavior therapy) and problem-solving therapy, compared to usual care by PCP's (i.e. antidepressant medication, drug placebo, or unspecified control). The authors concluded that evidence-based psychotherapies adapted for the primary care setting are comparable to pharmacotherapy alone and superior to PCP's usual care. The use of brief evidence-based psychotherapies, such as those reviewed by Schulberg et al., 2002, are fundamental within the PCBH model. The PCBH model emphasizes a problem-focused and functional-contextual approach to assessment and treatment of behavioral health and mental disorders. Wolf and Hopko's (2008) recent review of treatments for depression in primary care concluded that adaptations of CBT for depression in primary care are "probably efficacious." Research also shows that providing basic training in CBT to PCPs is not enough to produce robust clinical outcomes (King et al., 2002); highlighting the importance of the BHC's integrated role in primary care. With respect to the impact of behavioral health consultation on pharmacological treatment of major and minor depression, compared to usual care Katon et al. (1995) found improved medication adherence, increased patient satisfaction with treatment, and overall greater improvements in mood over time for major depression. Inclusion of a behavioral health professional in the treatment of depression in primary care improves outcomes, patient and physician satisfaction, and costs less than usual care. The PCBH model prioritizes the usage of treatment algorithms based on scientific guidelines that include pharmacological and psychotherapeutic interventions. This approach seeks to ensure that patients receive the safest and most effective treatments available.

==== Anxiety care ====
Although less empirical attention has been directed toward improving treatment of anxiety disorders in primary care, Stanley et al. found 8 sessions of CBT delivered in a co-located model, superior to usual care for generalized anxiety disorder. Additionally, a collaborative care approach that packaged brief CBT with pharmacotherapy reduced disability, increased remitted symptoms, and decreased anxiety sensitivity for individuals diagnosed with panic disorder relative to usual care and demonstrated greater improvement in depression, anxiety, and disability measures at 6 month follow-up. Further, clinical guidelines for the treatment of generalized anxiety disorder and panic disorder in primary care recommend behavior therapy and/or SSRI.

==== Health behavior change ====
In regard to other health behaviors, strict utilization of the BHC model has shown significant improvements in sleep difficulties, while less integrated models of behavioral health have produced favorable outcomes for smoking cessation, diabetes adherence, and pain disorders. Whitlock et al., suggest brief behavioral interventions have only a modest impact on health behavior change. However, they also suggested that within a population-based model of care modest changes in behavioral health "translate to significant effects."

=== Alternative models of care ===
==== Traditional outpatient psychotherapy ====
Commonly called "specialty" care, traditional outpatient psychotherapy usually involves treatment of mental health concerns in an outpatient clinic or another setting independent of medical care. Sessions are usually 50 minutes in length and the duration of treatment may vary from weeks to years depending on the mental health concern. Typically, little contact occurs between therapists and patients' physicians or psychiatrists, and coordination of care may be difficult, time consuming, and expensive. The payment and access systems for specialty mental health are also usually distinct from and more cumbersome than that for primary care treatment.

==== Co-located care model ====
Behavioral health providers and PCPs practice within the same office or building but maintain separate care delivery systems, including records and treatment plans. However, behavioral health providers and PCPs may consult one another for enhanced treatment outcomes.

== Policy ==
Funding has been a barrier to the implementation of the PCBH consultant model. The cost of treatment and lack of affordable health care has been a barrier for many people with mental illness to receive treatment. In the private sector insurance market mental health treatment is often segregated from other medical care, isolated in separate systems of care and payment. Typically this makes it more difficult for patients to access services readily, if at all. For uninsured patients the United States federal government can provide (depending on eligibility criteria) Medicaid which provides insurance coverage for a large number of individuals with severe and persistent mental illness. The federal government provides money to each state to fund Medicaid programs and provides general mandates on how the money must be spent. Because the federal government has special relationships with Veteran's Administration hospitals and clinics and federally qualified health centers and because several federal agencies have identified integrated care as key targets for improved primary care, the PCBH model has been able to take root in these systems whereas only a few PCBH programs exist in private insurance environments. One major barrier in some states (states can set some of their own rules with regard to Medicaid) is the prohibition of same-day billing. This makes it impossible for a PCBH program since the fundamental concept behind PCBH is the provision of services (medical and mental health visit) on the same day. Typically eligible professionals for Medicaid reimbursement in federally qualified health centers include psychiatrists, psychologists and licensed clinical social workers. Access to care and payment tends to be less restrictive with Medicare, another federal program for persons without private insurance.

The other major issue impacting the development of the PCBH model is the dearth of well-trained mental health workers. At present professional training programs with an emphasis in primary care are limited in number which has led to the growth of internships of varying kinds to train students and retrain professionals (see training programs below).

=== PCBH and health disparities in the United States ===
As the population of the United States becomes more diverse, the approach to population-based care must also adjust accordingly. Projections published by the U.S. Census Bureau estimate that by the year 2042 White, non-Hispanic people will no longer be the majority of the population in the United States. According to the 2010 census, White, non-Hispanic people are no longer the majority of the population in Texas, California, the District of Columbia, Hawaii, and New Mexico. The changing population of the United States is generating a need to incorporate cultural competence into the way primary care services are delivered. These changes in the population are concurrent with increasing evidence of disparities in the quality of care that is provided to historically underserved populations within the United States. Underserved populations have low levels of access and utilization based on economic, cultural, and systemic barriers to care.

Behavioral health providers in primary care settings have an opportunity to directly impact health care disparities by designing "…strategies to enhance cooperative or healthy behavior". "The premise is that mismatches in models (i.e., expectations about illness and health interactions) between the patient and the health provider may render medical care 'psychologically' inaccessible to ethnic minorities, resulting in poorer health outcomes for these populations (possibly via noncompliance)." Strategies that help bridge mismatches improve treatment outcomes and make care more accessible for underserved populations.

By establishing a role in primary care, the front-line of health-care delivery, behavioral health providers gain direct access to patients and providers. Healthy People 2010, published in 2007, recommended "that early intervention efforts to protect and promote mental health, including screening and the promotion of mental health awareness, become an essential component of primary care visits and school health assessments.". This objective has been largely retained in the proposed objectives for Healthy People 2020. As Hass and deGruy pointed out, "The primary care patient may or may not believe that she has a mental problem, and may or may not be ready to agree to psychological treatment ... primary care psychologists [must] make services accessible and understandable to patients…". Because of the difference in how patients, particularly those from underserved groups, may express their distress and respond to the stigma of mental illness providing Behavioral Health services through primary care will likely make services more psychologically and physically accessible.

Providing culturally-competent, population based care can difficult to conceptualize, particularly in the context of the fast-paced environment of primary care. Hunter et al. propose "a patient-centered, culturally competent approach for effective communication and care…that includes the Explanatory model of health and illness, Social and environmental factors affecting adherence, Fears and concerns about medication and side effects, Treatment understanding model of culturally competent practice". By adopting this kind of approach, Behavioral Health providers can help primary care providers meet the medical, psychological, and cultural needs of the patient.

== History ==
In the early 1960s, Kaiser Permanente, an early HMO, uncovered that 60% of physician visits were either individuals who were somatizing stress or whose physical condition was exacerbated by emotional factors. These findings prompted Kaiser to explore various strategies to better manage psychosocial complaints, with ultimate goal of cost reduction. Psychotherapy, which was offered as a prepaid benefit, was studied as a method to reduce primary care visits while also more properly (and less expensively) addressing the problem at hand. Studies revealed that by participating in brief psychotherapy, medical utilization reduced by 65%. The initiatives at Kaiser Permanente set in motion a large body of research on medical cost-offset, a term for the reduction in medical costs that occurs as a result of a patient receiving appropriately designed behavior health services in lieu of more expensive medical services. The National Institute of Mental Health (NIMH) funded several replications examining medical cost offset in the years to follow, with reductions of cost around 30 to 65%. One important trend that emerged in this literature was the greater the collaboration between primary care, the better the cost offset. Likewise, the more "traditional" the behavioral interventions, the less the medical cost offset.

In 1981, the Health Care Financing Administration (HCFA) sponsored the Hawaii Medicaid Project, a seven-year prospective study examining the impact of a new, collaborative behavioral health system among 36,000 Medicaid beneficiaries and 91,000 federal employees in Honolulu. This landmark trial compared the medical cost-offset among patients who received brief and targeted interventions, those who received a 52-session annual psychotherapy benefit, and those who received no treatment. The results showed that the brief, targeted interventions reduced saved $350 per patient per year while psychotherapy actually increased costs by $750 per year. The Hawaii Medicaid Project became the prototype for cost offset research and spawned future projects among managed care organizations, with goal of reducing costs. In 1987, Humana followed suit by studying brief behavioral intervention among Medicare recipients in Florida, with the intention of reducing medical utilization among recent widows and widowers. Known as the Bereavement Program, Humana learned after 2 years $1400 could be saved per patient via brief group intervention for bereavement. In the 1990s, other HMOs and regional group practices began to integrate behavioral health services into primary care, including Kaiser Permanente, Healthcare Partners, Group Health Cooperative of Puget Sound, Kaiser Group Health of Minnesota, and Duke University Medical Center.

In the years to follow, behavioral health integration started to gain support from a federal level, as United States Department of Veterans Affairs (VA) systems began to conduct research around the impact of primary care psychologists, beginning with the Healthcare Network of Upstate New York (VISN2). In the last decade, additional VA systems have followed suit with primary care behavioral health programs of their own to meet the increasing mental health demands of soldiers returning from war. More recently, federal support has begun to take hold by increasing funding for integrated behavioral health services for various federally qualified health centers (FQHCs) in the United States. Primary care behavioral health was seen as a solution in FQHCs to address the mental health needs of the Medicaid and uninsured populations, with the goal of better treatment and reduced overall costs.
