= Community counseling =

Guidance and counseling is a process of helping an individual become fully aware of his/ herself and the ways in which he is responding to the influence of his/her environment. Counseling is a generic term for any of professional counseling that treats dysfunction occurring within a group of related people. This term describes a preventive system of counseling that works to combat psychological impairment through the improvement and development of community support. A community is defined as a group of interacting individuals who share a commonality. This commonality can be anything from location of residence to career interest, but a community counselor will use this common characteristic to council groups of people.

Guidance and Counseling actually refers to directing, steering, advising, leading, piloting and controlling individuals towards actions, behaviours, decision and opinions that would be beneficial to them.

== Importance ==
The community that individuals function within can have a significant influence on their identity and connection to others. A community counselor can work with groups of people experiencing an increased amount of psychological distress to help determine and address the source of the disturbance. Such interventions are used in communities which are poor and unsupported to improve mental health resources. Dysfunctional environments can lead individuals to develop social and psychological impairments. Vulnerable and marginalized populations such as children, minorities, or individuals of a low socioeconomic status are disproportionately at risk of experiencing psychological impairments. Through the holistic treatment of a community, counselors can help alleviate mental health issues on a large scale. Community counseling provides leadership for creating better access to mental health services. Through the analysis of individual interviews, Jon Boller and Burton Nolan revealed that many students report a need and desire for community counseling programs. To meet these needs, community counseling continues to expand its reach.

== History ==
The Great Depression and World War II created a need for jobs and counseling services in the United States. This need was met with the expansion of career, school, and personal counseling services. At the same time, experts in the field began to emphasize the importance of preventive counseling in combating the need for remedial counseling. In 1965, the United States government allocated federal funds to the training of school counselors, a type of community based counseling. At the start of the 1970s, the more general idea of community counseling was developed to meet the increasing needs of the public. The discipline of community counseling grew slowly at first due to its lack of clear definition. However, in 1993, community counseling received recognition as a counseling specialization from the governing council of the American Counseling Association (ACA). This recognition allowed the Council for Accreditation of Counseling Relation Education (CACREP) to develop standards for the training of community counselors. With recognition and accreditation, community counseling expanded in popularity.

== Role of the counselor ==
Community counselors can work in a variety of settings such as private practice, mental health centers, rehabilitation facilities, or prisons. Regardless of the setting, a community counselor's job is to work with individuals to develop appropriate mental processing and provide preventive services to the community. Preventive efforts can be made by providing access to community-based organizations or educational programs. Community counselors need to be strong leaders who can make these direct and indirect services available for their clients.

== Models ==
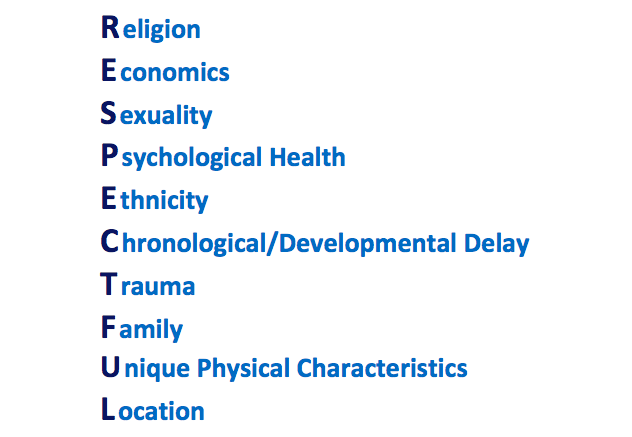
The Respectful Model of Community Counseling

The Respectful Model

The Respectful Model is a holistic approach of understanding a community and its associated issues. This form of counseling can be done individually or in groups across all ages and genders. The model is based on a ten-letter acronym designed to highlights factors that influence community dynamic. Counselors are expected to respect clients regardless of their religious affiliation, economic status, sexual orientation, psychological health, ethnicity, developmental differences, trauma, family, physical appearance, or genealogy. This inclusive and holistic approach to community counseling allows for an appreciation of environmental influence on mental health.

The Marginalized Community Model

Annabel Manzanilla-Manalo and Fermin Manalo developed a community-based counseling approach to help marginalized groups overcome mental health problems that result from inequality and discrimination. This approach works to integrate community psychology within the context of a social environment. The model values inclusivity, social justice, solidarity, and equality. Community counselors work to facilitate healthy development and establish a system that ensures the delivery of mental health services to the community. This model is focused on empowerment of individuals with the goal of relieving stigma or shame these individuals might feel because of their marginalized identity. This is achieved through support of group formation, enhancement of local resources, research, advocacy, and facilitation of collective action.

== Applications ==
=== Children ===
Children can suffer developmental and social delays because of untreated mental health issues. Analysis of archival data from 364 children who visited a community counseling clinic revealed that treatment could significantly reduce internalizing and externalizing behavioral problems for children. However, the analysis also found that over half of the children who began treatment did not complete the full course of the available community counseling services. High dropout rates are often considered a significant barrier to providing effective community counseling.

=== Adults ===
Older individuals who did not receive counseling for early psychological dysfunction or individuals who have experienced trauma later in life can benefit from community therapy. A study of Vietnam War veterans demonstrated that community-based readjustment counseling can significantly reduce posttraumatic stress disorder (PTSD) and improve life-satisfaction. From these results, researchers have hypothesized that community counseling could produce more effective services for veterans in need of PTSD treatment. Programs and services that work to relieve psychological impairments such as PTSD can significantly improve the well-being of adults.

=== Substance abuse ===
Community counselors can also act as members of the interdisciplinary teams used to holistically treat persons with drug addiction. Community support and promotion of healthy habits can help improve the well-being of individuals struggling with addiction. In a study examining recovery from alcoholism, 50 participants were assigned to either a community counseling based intervention or a control condition. Results showed a significant reduction in drinking rates for individuals in the intervention which suggests that community counseling can help aid individuals in the process of addiction recovery.

== Training counselors ==
To become a community counselor, an individual must get both a bachelor's degree and a masters in counseling. After receiving both degrees, an individual must obtain 3,000 supervised work hours before being able to practice independently. Once they have completed their necessary training, community counselors are expected to understand the power of environmental influences, the importance of a multifaceted approach to counseling, and the need for preventive action. Additionally, community counselors need to be able to cultivate positive forces in the environment to improve the mental health of the community. Despite these clear expectations of a community counselor, there is a large variation in the required coursework and semester hours needed to receive a master's degree from a community counseling program. A study that compared the coursework requirements at 32 master's-level CACREP-approved community counseling programs found three general subsets to the curriculum: entry level, environmental, and specialty area courses. The range of recommended courses revealed a vast diversity across community counseling programs. The most common courses reported were:

- Introduction to Community Agencies
- Community Resources
- Counseling Theories
- Counseling Techniques
- Group Counseling Procedures
- Tests and Appraisal
- Professional Issues
- Consultation Techniques
- Administration and Management of Agency Services
- Program Evaluation
- Personality Development
- Normal/Abnormal Behavior
- Ethics
- Research Methods
- Advanced Seminal in Community Counseling
- Counseling Practicum

While a large diversity of courses can help produce well-rounded counselors, continuing to increase professional standards could aid in the development of community counseling programs.

Despite the range of courses offered, an examination of Tennessee's approved certification competencies revealed an insufficient level of customization needed for the various specializations within community counseling. The study showed that learning, adjustment, counseling, ethics, and report writing competencies were needed across all sub disciplines of community counseling. However, the study demonstrated that aside from the five overlapping competencies, very different skill sets were needed for successful training in a specialty. This finding highlights the need for specialized programs in community counseling. However, a survey 104 Directors of CACREP-accredited community counseling programs explored the director's vision for the community counseling program in the future. The results were split. Approximately half of respondents saw community counseling as preparation for generic group counseling, while the other half wanted to see an increase in specializations. This disagreement highlighted a lack of communication across the field of community counseling. Despite this lack of communication, a national survey of master's level community counseling programs revealed a central emphasis on prevention and systematic community intervention. This finding suggests that community counseling programs have developed a central purpose in the absence of standardized requirements and specializations.

== Considerations ==
In any discipline that works with vulnerable populations, it is important that the field holds professionals to a set of ethical standards. In community counseling, ethical standards provide a code of practice to which counselors are expected to abide. This set of rules establishes what counselors may and may not do within the counselor-patient relationship. These rules are in place to protect patients from malpractice. Not only do the rules work to ensure the integrity of the counseling profession, but they help to build trust between the public and the counseling community. The American Counseling Association has set forth specific standards for ethical counseling practice that include: protecting clients from harm, promoting client welfare, avoiding multiple relationships, maintaining confidentiality, continuing involvement in professional associations, only practicing within training, and never misrepresenting qualifications. While this list is not exhaustive, it provides basic ethical standards that can be followed by professionals. When these ethical standards are not maintained, legal action may be taken. This legal action can lead to loss of licensure and the ability to practice within the field of community counseling.
