= TVM (insurance) =

TVM U.A.
- Company type: Mutual
- Industry: Insurance
- Founded: 1962
- Headquarters: Hoogeveen, the Netherlands
- Products: Transportation Insurance
- Revenue: ▲€162.6 million (2006)
- Net income: ▼€12.3 million (2006)
- Number of employees: 278 (2006)
- Website: www.tvm.nl

TVM (Transport Verzekerings Maatschappij, Transportation Insurance Company) is a Dutch insurance company specialised in providing insurance to transportation companies. It is a mutual company founded in 1962 by a number of transportation companies, and is headquartered in Hoogeveen.

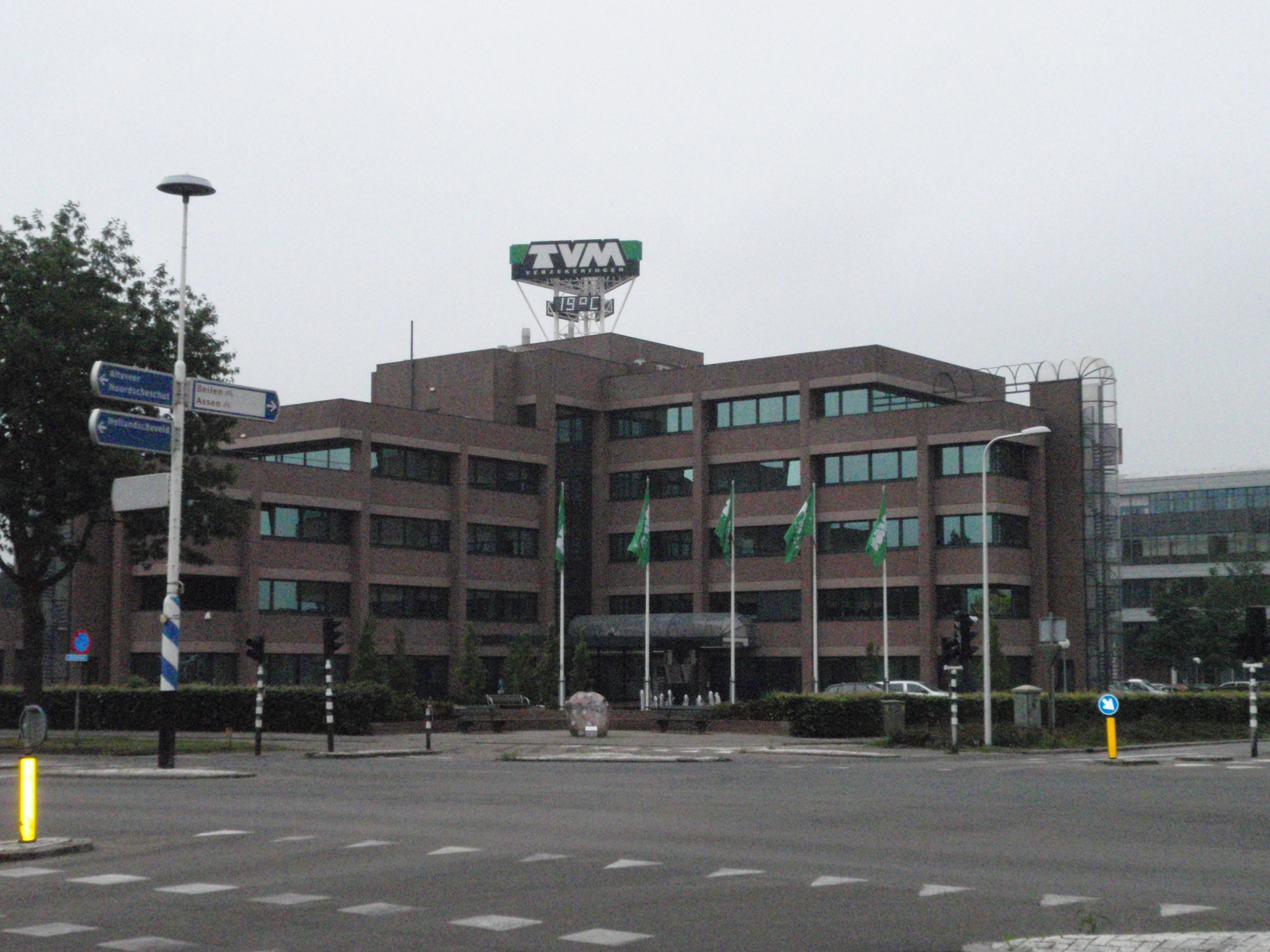
TVM Headquarters (June 4, 2008)

TVM is well known as sponsor of a number of sporting teams. For a number of years, TVM sponsored a cycling team, withdrawing their support at the beginning of 2000 after a doping scandal. TVM also sponsors ice skating, and number of famous skaters are sponsored by TVM; Renate Groenewold, Carl Verheijen, Sven Kramer, Paulien van Deutekom, Jan Smeekens, Erben Wennemars and Ireen Wüst. The company has indicated it wishes to continue sponsoring them until at least the 2010 Winter Olympics.
