= Wide Range Assessment of Memory and Learning =

Memory functioning test

The Wide Range Assessment of Memory and Learning (WRAML), currently in its third edition (WRAML3), is a standardized, individually administered test that measures memory functioning. It evaluates both immediate, delayed and recognition memory ability along with the acquisition of new learning. The WRAML3 is normed for individuals ages 5–90 years.

The WRAML3 is composed of verbal, visual, and attention-concentration subtests, which can be used to yield Immediate, Delayed and Recognition Verbal Memory Indexes; Immediate, Delayed and Recognition Memory Visual Memory Indexes; and an Attention-Concentration Index. These subtests yield aggregate Immediate, Delayed, and Recognition Indexes as well as a General Memory Index. In addition, a Working Memory Index consists of parallel versions of Visual and Verbal Working Memory subtests. While there is a core of subtests, there are several options of how battery content can be utilized, including two abbreviated formats. An embedded performance validity measure is also available.

The WRAML3 is currently published by Pearson Assessments.
