= Bonded Fibre Matrix =

Hydroseeding mulch used for erosion control

Bonded Fibre Matrix (BFM) mulch is a type of hydroseeding erosion control product.

The matrix is a continuous layer of elongated fibre strands held together by a water-resistant bonding agent. It keeps raindrops from hitting the soil because it has no holes larger than one millimetre. It allows no gaps between the product and the soil. It has a high water-holding capacity. It will not form a water-insensitive crust that can inhibit plant growth. It biodegrades into materials that help plant growth.
