= Clinical Associate in Applied Psychology =

In Scotland, a Clinical Associate is a shortened designation for a Clinical Associate in Applied Psychology (CAAP). A Clinical Associate is a specialist regulated mental health professional whose duties include assessing, formulating, and treating clients all within specified ranges of conditions and age. Clinical Associates work either in primary care adult mental health settings or in a range of setting working with children, young people, and their families.

== History and development ==
The role of Clinical Associate was first introduced in 2005. Following consultation with National Health Service Scotland (NHS Scotland), NHS Education for Scotland (NES) commissioned a new master's level training program designed to equip graduate Psychologists with the competencies required to deliver circumscribed psychological services.

The role of Clinical Associate was developed with an aim to increase access to primary care psychological services in two main specialities: child and adolescent therapies in primary care and adult therapies in primary care. The University of Stirling and the University of Dundee developed the initial one-year Clinical Associate training scheme sponsored by NHS Education for Scotland (NES).

Since inception, Master of Science (MSc) applied training programs in Scotland for Clinical Associates have been developed in two specialties: Psychological Therapy in Primary Care (adults) and Early Interventions for Children and Young People.

The master's level training program focused on Psychological Therapy in Primary Care (adults) is intended to equip trainees with the ability to assess and treat adults experiencing more common mental health disorders (such as anxiety and depression) while under clinical supervision. The master's level training program focused on Early Interventions for Children and Young People is intended to train skills required to assess and treat children, young people, and their families experiencing more common mental health disorders with a strong emphasis on the early years and early intervention.

Although other forms of therapy are also explored, currently the emphasis of existing Clinical Associate in Applied Psychology (CAAP) programs is on a cognitive behavioral therapy (CBT) based approach.

== Professional training and certification to practice ==
The training required to practice as a Clinical Associate consists of an MSc in either Psychological Therapies in Primary Care (adults) or in Applied Psychology for Children and Young People. Clinical Associate candidates must have a British Psychological Society (BPS) accredited psychology undergraduate degree. It is intended that the undergraduate psychology knowledge base will be further developed during the postgraduate training in one of the Clinical Associate MSc level programs.

Currently, it is required that the master's level training programs encompass a theoretical, research, and applied foundation of psychology. The knowledge acquired during the master's level training will then be applied to the needs of specific client groups. Training in the existing Clinical Associate MSc programs generally takes place during a little over one year of full-time study. Once admitted to training, Academic requirements (non-clinical) must be demonstrated to masters MSc level, including the production of an original piece of research which will contribute to the scientific understanding of a relevant area. Requirements to practice are similar to that of Clinical Psychology in the UK (within the appropriate speciality) and include demonstration of competence in clinical practice, assessment, diagnosis, formulation, treatment and research design and evaluation. While enrolled in one of the master's level training programs, Clinical Associates receive a salary from the NHS Health Boards in Scotland. At the end of the training, if they were successful in the program, the candidate would be awarded a master's degree in Applied Psychology (as a Clinical Associate), often with a specific client group listed as expertise.

Clinical Associates have a circumscribed nature of expertise and must often consult with senior colleagues (fully licensed psychology practitioners) under whose support and supervision they practice. After graduation, master's level Clinical Associates are classified as having the expertise to work within a specific client group and with specific psychological disorders. As in all psychological fields, it is expected that Clinical Associates remain aware of ongoing research regarding (at least) their specialized client groups.

It is intended that, following completion of one of the master's level training programs in Applied Psychology (as a Clinical Associate), newly appointed Clinical Associates will apply for Clinical Associate in Applied Psychology (CAAP) job posts in the NHS of Scotland. While award of the MSc in Applied Psychology (Clinical Associate) confers eligibility for a Clinical Associate in Applied Psychology post in the NHS of Scotland, there is no guarantee of employment following training.

== Master's in Applied Psychology (Clinical Associate) vs. Doctorate in Clinical Psychology/Counselling Psychology ==
The Doctorate in Clinical Psychology, and that in Counselling Psychology are recognized by the British Psychological Society (BPS), as the threshold levels required to work as a largely autonomous scientist practitioner, while the Master's in Applied Psychology (Clinical Associate) is more limited with regard to the level of academic preparation and range of certified practice. Clinical Associate practitioners operate in a relatively circumscribed manner within a particular specialty while holders of a Doctorate in Clinical Psychology can work in a range of environments and specialties. In addition, Applied Psychology (Clinical Associate) practitioners are required to work under the supervision of a qualified Clinical Psychologist/Counselling Psychologist while those with a Doctorate in Clinical Psychology or Counselling Psychology can work, "unsupervised"; aside from the requirements of professional practice.

== Similar roles in the United States ==
Although the label of "Clinical Associate" or "Clinical Associate in Applied Psychology (CAAP)" is unique to Scotland, there are other countries that also allow holders of master's degrees in Clinical Psychology to practice in somewhat limited capacities.

In the United States, there are a number of U.S. schools that offer master's degree programs in Clinical Psychology. These programs often take 2 to 3 years to complete post-Bachelor's degree and the training usually emphasizes theory and treatment over research, quite often with a focus on school or couples and family counseling. While many graduates of master's-level training programs go on to earn their Doctorate in Clinical Psychology, a large number chose to go directly into practice—often as a Marriage and Family Therapist (MFT), Licensed Psychological Associate (LPA), or Licensed Professional Counselor (LPC). When working under the supervision of a doctoral psychologist, master's graduates can work as Psychological Assistants in clinical, counseling, or research settings.

Most master's degree programs do not require an undergraduate major in psychology, but do require coursework in introductory psychology, experimental psychology, and statistics.
