= Time-varying microscale model =

The time-varying microscale (TVM) model is a microscale diagnostic model specifically designed to compute data for extremely high-resolution mapping (tens of meters to a few hundred meters) without the high computational costs of running a mesoscale numerical weather prediction (NWP) model such as weather research and forecasting model (WRF).

TVM uses high-resolution land surface data to calculate the effects of microscale terrain features, near-surface roughness features, and other terrain blocking effects typically left unresolved by coarser mesoscale NWP models. Microscale terrain features are resolved using a kinematic terrain adjustment, near-surface roughness features are resolved using a log-profile surface roughness adjustment, and a Froude number adjustment is applied to calculate terrain-blocking effects on wind flow.

All of these effects are computed at each time-step in the study period and based not only on wind speed and elevation, but on quantities such as wind direction and thermodynamic properties of the lower atmosphere. This enables a sophisticated time-varying spatial analysis.
