= Millon Clinical Multiaxial Inventory =

Psychological assessment tool

- Purpose: information on personality traits and psychopathology

The Millon Clinical Multiaxial Inventory – Fourth Edition (MCMI-IV) is the most recent edition of the Millon Clinical Multiaxial Inventory. The MCMI is a psychological assessment tool intended to provide information on personality traits and psychopathology, including specific mental disorders outlined in the DSM-5. It is intended for adults (18 and over) with at least a 5th grade reading level who are currently seeking mental health services. The MCMI was developed and standardized specifically on clinical populations (i.e. patients in clinical settings or people with existing mental health problems), and is not intended to be used with the general population or adolescents. However, there is evidence base that shows that it may still retain validity on non-clinical populations, and so psychologists will sometimes administer the test to members of the general population, with caution. The concepts involved in the questions and their presentation make it unsuitable for those with below average intelligence or reading ability.

The MCMI-IV is based on Theodore Millon's evolutionary theory and is organized according to a multiaxial format. Updates to each version of the MCMI coincide with revisions to the DSM.

The fourth edition is composed of 195 true-false questions that take approximately 25–30 minutes to complete. It was created by Theodore Millon, Seth Grossman, and Carrie Millon.

The test is modeled on four categories of scales:

- 15 Personality Pattern Scales
- 10 Clinical Syndrome Scales
- 5 Validity Scales: 3 Modifying Indices; 2 Random Response Indicators
- 45 Grossman Personality Facet Scales (based on Seth Grossman's theories of personality and psychopathology)

== Theory ==
The Millon Clinical Multiaxial Inventories are based on Theodore Millon's evolutionary theory. Millon's theory is one of many theories of personality. Briefly the theory is divided into three core components which Millon cited as representing the most basic motivations. These core components are which each manifest in distinct polarities (in parentheses):

- Existence (Pleasure – Pain)
- Adaptation (Passive – Active)
- Reproduction (Self – Other)

Furthermore, this theory presents personality as manifesting in three functional and structural domains, which are further divided into subdomains:

- Behavioral
- Phenomenological
- Intrapsychic
- Biophysical

Finally, the Millon Evolutionary Theory outlines 15 personalities, each with a normal and abnormal presentation. The MCMI-IV is one of several measures in a body of personality assessments developed by Millon and associates based on his theory of personality.

== History ==
=== MCMI ===
In 1969, Theodore Millon wrote the book Modern Psychopathology, after which he received many letters from students stating that his ideas were helpful in writing their dissertations. This was the event that prompted him to undertake test construction of the MCMI himself. The original version of the MCMI was published in 1977 and corresponds with the DSM-III. It contained 11 personality scales and 9 clinical syndrome scales.

=== MCMI-II ===
With the publication of the DSM-III-R, a new version of the MCMI (MCMI-II) was published in 1987 to reflect the changes made to the revised DSM. The MCMI-II contained 13 personality scales and 9 clinical syndrome scales. The antisocial-aggressive scale was separated into two separate scales, and the masochistic (self-defeating) scale was added. Additionally, 3 modifying indices added and a 3-point item-weighting system introduced.

=== MCMI-III ===
The MCMI-III was published in 1994 and reflected revisions made in the DSM-IV. This version eliminated specific personality scales and added scales for depressive and PTSD bringing the total number of scales to 14 personality scales, 10 clinical syndrome scales, and 5 correction scales. The previous 3-point item-weighting scale was modified to a 2-point scale. Additional content was added to include child abuse, anorexia and bulimia. The Grossman Facet scales are also new to this version. The MCMI-III is composed of 175 true-false questions that reportedly take 25–30 minutes to complete.

=== MCMI-IV ===
The MCMI-IV was published in 2015. This version contains 195 true-false items and takes approximately 25–30 minutes to complete. The MCMI-IV consists of 5 validity scales, 15 personality scales and 10 clinical syndrome scales. Changes from the MCMI-III include a complete normative update, both new and updated test items, changes to remain aligned to the DSM-5, the inclusion of ICD-10 code types, an updated set of Grossman Facet Scales, the addition of critical responses, and the addition of the Turbulent Personality Scale.

== Format ==
The MCMI-IV contains a total of 30 scales broken down into 25 clinical scales and 5 validity scales. The 25 clinical scales are divided into 15 personality and 10 clinical syndrome scales (the clinical syndrome scales are further divided into 7 Clinical Syndromes and 3 Severe Clinical Syndromes). The personality scales are further divided into 12 Clinical Personality Patterns and 3 Severe Personality Pathology scales.

=== Personality scales ===
The personality scales are associated with personality patterns identified in Millon's evolutionary theory and the DSM-5 personality disorders. There are two main categories of personality scales: Clinical Personality Pattern Scales and Severe Personality Pathology Scales. Each of the personality scales contain 3 Grossman Facet Scales for a total of 45 Grossman Facet Scales. When interpreting the personality scales, the authors recommend that qualified professionals interpret the Severe Personality Pathology scales before the Clinical Personality Pattern scales as the pattern of responding indicated by the Severe Personality Pathology scale scores may also affect the scores on the Clinical Personality Pattern scales (i.e. if an individual scores high on the Severe Personality Pathology scale P (Paranoid), this may also explain the pattern of scores on the Clinical Personality Pattern scales).

==== Grossman Facet Scales ====
The Grossman Facet Scales were added to improve the overall clinical utility and specificity of the test, and attempt to influence future iterations of the Diagnostic and Statistical Manual of Mental Disorders (DSM). The hope was the DSM would adopt the prototypical feature identification method used in the MCMI to differentiate between personality disorders.

There are three facet scales within each of the Clinical Personality Patterns and Severe Personality Pathology scales. Each facet scale is thought to help identify the key descriptive components of each personality scale, making it easier to evaluate slight differences in symptom presentations between people with elevated scores on the same personality scale. For instance, two profiles with an elevated score on the Borderline scale may have differences in their Temperamentally Labile facet scale scores. This would mean, for clinical treatment or assessment planning, you could have a better understanding of how quickly and spontaneously a person's mood may change, compared to others with elevated Borderline scale scores.

There are also some noteworthy limitations of the Grossman facet scales. The MCMI personality scales share some of the same test items, leading to strong intercorrelations between different personality scales. Additionally, each facet consists of less than 10 items and the items are often similar to ones in other facets of the same personality scale. Thus, it is unclear how much a facet measures a unique component of a personality scale. Furthermore, statistical analysis has found some items within the facet scales may not be consistently measuring the same component as other items on that scale, with some item alpha coefficients as low as .51. For these reasons it is recommended to use supplemental information, in addition to that provided by the facet scales, to inform any assessment or treatment decisions.

==== Summary table of personality scales ====
Abbreviation	Description
Clinical Personality Patterns
1	Schizoid
2A	Avoidant
2B	Melancholic
3	Dependent
4A	Histrionic
4B	Turbulent
5	Narcissistic
6A	Antisocial
6B	Sadistic
7	Compulsive
8A	Negativistic
8B	Masochistic
Severe Personality Pathology
S	Schizotypal
C	Borderline
P	Paranoid

=== Clinical syndrome scales ===
10 Clinical Syndrome Scales correspond with clinical disorders of the DSM-5. Similar to the personality scales, the 10 clinical syndrome scales are broken down into 7 clinical syndrome scales (A-R) and 3 severe clinical syndrome scales (SS-PP). When interpreting the clinical scales, the authors recommend that qualified professionals interpret the Severe Clinical Syndrome scales before the Clinical Syndrome scales as the pattern of responding indicated by the Severe Clinical Syndrome scale scores may also affect the scores on the Clinical Syndrome scales (e.g. if an individual scores high on the Severe P scale Clinical Syndrome scale score (e.g. Thought Disorder), this may also explain the pattern of scores on the other Clinical Syndrome scales).

==== Summary table of clinical syndrome scales ====
Abbreviation	Description
Severe Clinical Syndrome
SS	Thought Disorder
CC	Major Depression
PP	Delusional Disorder
Clinical Syndrome
A	Generalized Anxiety
H	Somatic Symptom
N	Bipolar Disorder
D	Persistent Depression
B	Alcohol Use
T	Drug Use
R	Post-Traumatic Stress

=== Validity scales of MCMI ===
==== Modifying indices ====
The modifying indices consist of 3 scales: the Disclosure Scale (X), the Desirability Scale (Y) and the Debasement Scale (Z).

These scales are used to provide information about a patient's response style, including whether they presented themselves in a positive light (elevated Desirability scale) or negative light (elevated Debasement scale). The Disclosure scale measures whether the person was open in the assessment, or if they were unwilling to share details about his/her history.

==== Random response indicators ====
These two scales assist in detecting random responding. In general, the Validity Scale (V) contains a number of improbable items which may indicate questionable results if endorsed. The Inconsistency Scale (W) detects differences in responses to pairs of items that should be endorsed similarly. The more inconsistent responding on pairs of items, the more confident the examiner can be that the person is responding randomly, as opposed to carefully considering their response to items.

== Validity ==
The MCMI-IV was updated in 2015, with revised items and a new normative sample of 1,547 clinical patients. The process of updating the MCMI-IV was an iterative process from item generation, through item tryout, to standardization and the selection of final items to be included in the full scale.

Test construction underwent three stages of validation, more commonly known as the tripartite model of test construction (theoretical-substantive validity, internal-structural validity, and external-criterion validity). As development was an iterative process, each step was reanalyzed each time items were added or eliminated.

=== Theoretical-substantive validity ===
The first stage was a deductive approach and involved developing a large pool of items. 245 new items were generated by the authors in accordance with relevant personality research, reference materials, and the current diagnostic criteria. These items were then administered to 449 clinical and non-clinical participants. The number of items was reduced based on a rational approach according to the degree to which they fit Millon's evolutionary theory. Items were also eliminated based on simplicity, grammar, content, and scale relevance.

=== Internal-structural validity ===
Once the initial item pool was reduced after piloting, the second validation stage assessed how well items interrelated, and the psychometric properties of the test were determined. 106 items were retained and administered along with the 175 MCMI-III items. The ability of the MCMI items to give reliable indications of the domains of interest were examined using internal consistency and test-retest reliability. Internal consistency is the extent to which the items on a scale generally measure the same thing. Cronbach's alpha values (an estimate of internal consistency) median (average) values were 0.84 for the personality pattern scales, 0.83 for the clinical syndrome scales, and 0.80 for the Grossman Facet Scales. Test-retest reliability is an estimate of the stability of the responses in the same person over a brief period of time. Examining test-retest reliability requires administering the items from the MCMI-IV at two different time periods. The median testing interval between administrations was 13 days. The higher the correlation between scores at two time points, more stable the measure is. Based on 129 participants, the test-retest reliability of the MCMI-IV personality and clinical syndrome scales ranged from 0.73 (Delusional) to 0.93 (Histrionic) with a most values above 0.80. These statistics indicate that the measure is highly stable over a short period of time; however, no long-term data are available. After examining the psychometrics of these "tryout" items, 50 items were replaced, resulting in 284 items that were administered to the standardization sample of 1,547 clinical patients.

=== External-criterion validity ===
The final validation stage included examining convergent and discriminative validity of the test, which is assessed by correlating the test with similar/dissimilar instruments. Most correlations between the MCMI-IV Personality Pattern scales and the MMPI-2-RF (another widely used and validated measure of personality psychopathology) Restructured Clinical scales were low to moderate. Some, but not all, of the MCMI-IV Clinical Syndrome scales were correlated moderately to highly with the MMPI-2-RF Restructured Clinical and Specific Problem scales. The authors describe these relationships as "support for the measurement of similar constructs" across measures and that the validity correlations are consistent with the "argument that the two assessments are best used complimentarily to elucidate personality and clinical symptomatology in the therapeutic context".

== Scoring system ==
Patients' raw scores are converted to Base Rate (BR) scores to allow comparison between the personality indices. Converting scores to a common metric is typical in psychological testing so test users can compare the scores across different indices. However, most psychological tests use a standard score metric, such as a T-score; the BR metric is unique to the Millon instruments.

Although the Millon instruments emphasize personality functioning as a spectrum from healthy to disordered, the developers found it important to develop various clinically relevant thresholds or anchors for scores. BR scores are indexed on a scale of 0 – 115, with 0 representing a raw score of 0, a score of 60 representing the median of a clinical distribution, 75 serving as the cut score for presence of disorder, 85 serving as the cut score for prominence of disorder, and 115 corresponding to the maximum raw score. BR scores falling in the 60-74 range represent normal functioning, 75-84 correspond to abnormal personality patterns but average functioning, and BR scores above 85 are considered clinically significant (i.e., representing a diagnosis and functional impairment).

Conversion from raw scores to BR scores is relatively complex, and its derivation is based largely on the characteristics of a sample of 235 psychiatric patients, from which developers obtained MCMI profiles and clinician ratings of the examinees’ level of functioning and diagnosis. The median raw score for each scale within this sample was assigned a BR score of 60, and BR scores of 75 and 85 were assigned to raw score values that corresponded to the base rates of presence and prominence within the sample, respectively, of the condition represented by each scale. Intermediate values were interpolated between the anchor scores.

In addition, “corrections” to the BR scores are made to adjust for each examinee's response style as reflected by scores on the Modifying Indices. For example, if a Modifying Index score suggests that an examinee was not sufficiently candid (e.g., employed a socially desirable response style), BR scores are adjusted upward to reflect greater severity than the raw scores would suggest. Accordingly, the test is not appropriate for nonclinical populations or those without psychopathological concerns, as BR scores may adjust and indicate pathology in a case of normal functioning. Because computation of BR scores is conducted via computer (or mail-in) scoring, the complex modifying process is not transparent to test users.

Although this scaling is referred to as Base Rate scores, their values are anchored to base rates of psychiatric conditions in their developmental sample, and may not reflect the base rates of pathology specific to the population from which a given examinee is drawn. Further, because they are derived from a psychiatric sample, they cannot be applied meaningfully to nonpsychiatric samples, for which no norms are available and for which Modifying Indices adjustments have not been developed.

== Interpretation ==
Administration and interpretation of results should only be completed by a professional with the proper qualifications. The test creators advise that test users have completed a recognized graduate training program in psychology, supervised training and experience with personality scales, and possess an understanding of Millon's underlying theory.

Computer-based test interpretation reports are also available for the results of the MCMI-IV. As with all computer-based test interpretations, the authors caution that these interpretations should be considered a "professional-to-professional consultation" and integrated with other sources of information.

The interpretation of the results from the MCMI-IV is a complex process that requires integrating scores from all of the scales with other available information such as history and interview.

Test results may be considered invalid based on a number of different response patterns on the modifying indices.

Disclosure is the only score in the MCMI-IV in which the raw scores are interpreted and in which a particularly low score is clinically relevant. A raw score above 114 or below 7 is considered not to be an accurate representation of the patient's personality style as they either over-or under-disclosed and may indicate questionable results.

Desirability or Debasement base rate scores of 75 or greater indicate that the examiner should proceed with caution.

Personality and Clinical Syndrome base rate scores of 75–84 are taken to indicate the presence of a personality trait or clinical syndrome (for the Clinical Syndromes scales). Scores of 85 or above indicate the persistence of a personality trait or clinical syndrome.

Invalidity is a measure of random responding, ability to understand item content, appropriate attention to item content, and as an additional measure of response style. The scale is very sensitive to random responding. Scores on this scale determine whether the test protocol is valid or invalid.

== Similar measurement tools ==
The MCMI is one of several self-report measurement tools designed to provide information about psychological functioning and personality psychopathology. Similar tests include the Minnesota Multiphasic Personality Inventory and the Personality Assessment Inventory.

== See also ==
- Clinical psychology
- Personality test
- Psychological testing
