= Jon Elhai =

Jon Elhai (born 1972 in Baltimore, Maryland) is Distinguished Professor of clinical psychology at the University of Toledo. Elhai is known for being an expert in the assessment and diagnosis of post-traumatic stress disorder (PTSD), forensic psychological assessment of PTSD, and detection of fabricated/malingered PTSD; as well as in internet addictions.

== Academic career ==
Elhai earned his B.A. in Psychology from the University of Delaware in 1994. He earned his M.S. in Clinical Psychology in 1996 and his Ph.D. in 2000 from Nova Southeastern University. He completed a postdoctoral fellowship in PTSD at the Medical University of South Carolina and Charleston Veterans Affairs Medical Center. In 2003, he was awarded the Chaim Danieli Young Professional Award from the International Society for Traumatic Stress Studies. In 2007, he was awarded the Samuel J. and Anne G. Beck Award for outstanding early career research in personality assessment from the Society for Personality Assessment.

== Research ==
Elhai's research on PTSD has focused on such issues as assessment and diagnostic questions, psychopathology and symptom structure, co-occurring mental disorders, and psychological treatment issues.

Elhai is particularly known for examining the detection of fabricated PTSD using psychological assessment instruments such as the Minnesota Multiphasic Personality Inventory-2 (MMPI-2) and the Trauma Symptom Inventory. Elhai developed the Infrequency-Posttraumatic Stress Disorder scale (Fptsd) for the MMPI-2 as a means to detect fabricated PTSD, which has demonstrated modest success.

One of Elhai's particularly well-known scientific articles involved an examination of Vietnam combat military records. Specifically, because of anecdotes describing isolated cases of Americans falsely claiming to have served in combat during the Vietnam War and to suffer from PTSD as a result, B. Christopher Frueh, Elhai and collaborators examined the official military records of individuals presenting to the PTSD Clinic of the Charleston (South Carolina) Veterans Affairs Medical Center, in order to systematically evaluate the prevalence of fraudulently reported Vietnam combat exposure in 100 consecutively presenting individuals. The authors found evidence of some fraudulent cases: most alarming, 32% served in Vietnam but had no documentation of combat exposure, 3% served in the military but not in Vietnam, and 2% never served in the military. Although the Department of Veterans Affairs' Office of the Inspector General subsequently supported these results in their own study, others have challenged the use of official military records as an infallible method of corroborating combat exposure in support of a PTSD diagnosis. Nonetheless, the paper by Frueh, Elhai et al. continues to generate research and debate on the veracity of veterans' reports of combat exposure.

Elhai is also known for establishing the prevalence of using standardized instruments of traumatic event exposure and PTSD among traumatic stress clinicians and researchers.

More recently, Elhai has investigated research questions in Cyberpsychology, in particular the study of problematic smartphone use. He directs the University of Toledo‘s Cyberpsychology and Internet Addictions Research Lab.

== See also ==
- Malingering of post-traumatic stress disorder
- Post-traumatic stress disorder

== Bibliography ==
- Reyes, G., Elhai, J. D., & Ford, J. D. (Eds.) (2008). Encyclopedia of psychological trauma. (John Wiley & Sons)
