= Inwald Personality Inventory =

Personality test

The Inwald Personality Inventory (IPI) is a standardized personality test of adult pathology and personality. The IPI is utilized by public safety services to assess the fit of possible employees in public safety and law enforcement positions. The assessment can also indicate deviant behavior patterns.

The original IPI was created by Dr. Robin Inwald in 1980, and was published by Hilson Research. An updated version, the IPI-2, was released in 2011 by the Institute for Personality and Ability Testing, Inc. (IPAT). Original items from the IPI were reorganized in the creation of the current edition. While the IPI-2 features diagnostic criteria, it is not meant to be used as a mental health disorder diagnostic tool.

== History and use ==
=== IPI ===
The original IPI was created in 1980 by Dr. Robin Inwald and was published by Hilson Research. The assessment was created as a screening tool for applicants in high-risk positions, such as police candidates. The assessment was developed from over 2,500 pre-employment interviews with public safety officer candidates. Part of the purpose of the IPI was to counter the use of psychopathology tests, such as the MMPI, for the use of public safety selection tests. 310 true/false questions were implemented in the test. IPAT's Public Safety and Security Division acquired the assessment in March 2007, requiring clinicians to pay a fee every time it was administered. The assessment contained one validity scale (Guardedness) and 25 clinical scales:

- * Guardedness
- Rigid Type
- Alcohol
- Drugs
- Substance Abuse Driving Violations
- Job Difficulties
- Trouble with the Law and Society
- Antisocial Attitudes
- Type “A”
- Phobic Personality
- Lack of Assertiveness
- Obsessive Personality
- Depression
- Loner Type
- Interpersonal Difficulties
- Family Conflicts
- Sexual Concerns
- Spouse/Mate Concerns
- Undue Suspiciousness
- Unusual Experiences/Thoughts

* - Validity Scale

=== IPI-2 ===
The IPI-2 was released by the Institute for Personality and Ability Testing, Inc. (IPAT) in 2011. Items from the original IPI were reviewed for fit for the current revision, resulting in some items being removed because they were outdated and provocative by 21st century standards. Other items were reorganized into newly formulated content scales. The IPI-2 was created using a normative sample of 89,301 preexisting and rescored IPI records from the United States. 78.5% of this sample were male, and 21.5% were female. Ethnicities that are represented in the sample are as follows: 61.5% Caucasian, 19.4% African American, 13.3% Hispanic, 2.8% Native American, 2.3% Asian, and 0.6% Other. While these percentages could seem skewed, this ratio is representative of gender and ethnic percentages of public safety applicants according to the 2000 U.S. Census.

The assessment is made up of 202 true/false questions that are self-reported. Like its predecessor, the IPI-2 continues to measure characteristics or patterns of behavior that are unfavorable for those in high-risk professions. The assessment is fit for individuals who are ages 16 and older, and who have a minimum of a fifth-grade reading level. The assessment takes 30 to 40 minutes to complete, and is available in English, French, and Spanish. The assessment can always be taken by hand, but is now also available through the IPAT's online service or on OnSite Pro software. The IPI-2 contains 16 content scales and 1 validity scale (Guardedness):

- * Guardedness – GD – The degree to which an individual may be willing to share honest and candid responses or minimize shortcomings.
- Substance Use – SU – Assesses propensity toward alcohol and/or illicit drug use.
- Rigidity – RG – Assesses the difficulties an individual has in adapting to change.
- Passivity – PS – Measures the tendency to be submissive, and the level to which an individual is easily intimidated by others.
- Admitted Illegal Behavior – IB – Evaluates an individual's self-reported history of involvement in illegal activities and criminal behavior.
- Criminal Accusations – CA – Evaluates the criminal accusations put forth against an individual.
- Social Difficulties – SD – Assesses the degree to which an individual may struggle with creating and sustaining positive interpersonal relationships.
- Volatility – VT – Measures the tendency an individual has in losing their temper and the tendency to display violent outbursts.
- Anxiety – AX – Assesses the propensity an individual has toward anxiety and worry.
- Abnormal Thoughts – AT – Measures the degree to which an individual has difficulty in distinguishing fantasy from reality.
- Depressed Mood – DM – Measures the degree to which an individual is experiencing depressive feelings.
- Elevated Mood – EM – Measures the degree to which an individual is experiencing abnormal patterns of elevated energy and mood.
- Non-Conformity – NC – Evaluates antisocial attitudes that are present within the individual.
- Unreliability – UR – Assesses how much difficulty an individual has in meeting expectations and fulfilling responsibilities.
- Risk-Taking Tendencies – RT – Measures the tendency to discount potential negative consequences in favor of pursuing immediate gain.
- Irritability – IR – Evaluates the tendency for an individual to become easily annoyed/irritated and emotionally tense.
- Health Concerns – HC – Assesses an individual's pattern of lifestyle choices pertaining to health.

* - Validity Scale

== Scoring and Interpretation ==
Scoring for the IPI-2 involves comparison of scores with those of other public safety professionals in an effort to better predict proper fit for applicants. Scores for each scale are scores using T-scores, and those scores that are above a t-score of 60 are considered to be “elevated”, thereby warranting further exploration.

In testing validity of the IPI-2, internal consistency was measured using Cronbach's Alpha (overall=0.52). Significant correlations (<.05) were analyzed between IPI-2 scales and MMPI-2-RF and the PAI (Personality Assessment Inventory).

Results are combined with Field Training Officer (FTO) Predictions, in order to provide a more complete analysis. Results from FTO Predictions, coupled with IPI-2 results that were used in discriminant function analysis, lead to one of two outcomes for the categories of Control of Conflict, Public Relations, Report Writing, and Overall FTO Rating. The two outcomes for each of these categories are: ″likely to meet expectations″ or ″not likely to meet expectations″.

== See also ==
- Minnesota Multiphasic Personality Inventory
- Personality Assessment Inventory
