= Veterans Traumatic Brain Injury Care Improvement Act =

- Long title: To extend and modify a pilot program on assisted living services for veterans with traumatic brain injury.

Legislative history
- Introduced in the House as "Veterans Traumatic Brain Injury Care Improvement Act of 2014" (H.R. 4276) by Bill Cassidy (R–LA) on March 18, 2014; Committee consideration by House Veterans Affairs Committee

The Veterans Traumatic Brain Injury Care Improvement Act is a bill (H.R. 4276) introduced in the 113th U.S. Congress that would extend medical treatment and rehabilitation services to U.S. military veterans suffering from traumatic brain injuries.

== Purpose ==
The bill would change the benchmark used by a current federal pilot program for treatment from "assisted living" to "community-integrated rehabilitation (CIR)" services. The change would expand the treatment options available to veterans to include neurobehavioral, residential programs, day treatment, and home-based programs. The bill would authorize the pilot program for 8 years (up from 5). Additionally, the bill would require that the program is accessible in each VA region that contains a polytrauma center.

== Background ==
Between 2004 and 2014, over 280,000 American military service members (equivalent to approximately 18 percent of total military members) were diagnosed with traumatic brain injury.

== Related legislation ==
On August 8, 2012, President Obama signed into law the Veterans' Traumatic Brain Injury Rehabilitative Services' Improvements Act of 2011. Before that date, tramautic brain injury treatment at the VA hospitals focused on physical restoration. The legislation added some expansion to the focus of care to include more comprehensive and holistic rehabilitation plans.

In 2011, Senator Max Baucus introduced S. 666, the Veterans Traumatic Brain Injury Care Improvement Act of 2011, which would have directed the Secretary of Veterans Affairs to study the feasibility of creating a treatment center in the northern Rockies or the Dakotas and specifically evaluate Montana as a site for the center.

At the state level, a bill was introduced in March 2014 in the Oklahoma State Senate to provide free hyperbaric oxygen treatment for veterans suffering from traumatic brain injury.

== See also ==
- Casualties of the Iraq War (Traumatic brain injuries)
- Military Acute Concussion Evaluation
- Psychological injury (Traumatic brain_injury)
- Veterans For America
