= MCMI =

MCMI may refer to:

- Member of the Chartered Management Institute, the UK-based professional institution for managers.
- Millon Clinical Multiaxial Inventory
- Roman numeral for 1901
- Marseille Center for Mediterranean Integration
