= Malingering of post-traumatic stress disorder =

Feigning PTSD for ulterior motives

Because of the substantial benefits available to individuals with a confirmed PTSD diagnosis, which causes occupational impairment, the distinct possibility of false diagnoses exist, some of which are due to malingering of PTSD. Post-traumatic stress disorder (PTSD) is a mental disorder that may develop after an individual experiences a traumatic event. Malingering of PTSD consists of one feigning the disorder. In the United States, the Social Security Administration and the Department of Veterans Affairs each offer disability compensation programs that provide benefits for qualified individuals with mental disorders, including PTSD. These benefits can be substantial, making them attractive for those seeking financial gain. Concerns about individuals exploiting benefits can lead to restricted access to these resources, inadvertently making it more difficult for those with PTSD who genuinely need assistance to receive it. Malingering can lead to a decline in research and subsequent treatment for PTSD as it interferes with true studies. False data skews findings, making it more difficult to develop effective treatments. Insurance fraud may also come about through malingering, burdening the economy, healthcare systems, and taxpayers.

== Prevalence ==
The prevalence of malingering PTSD varies based on what one may be seeking. Differentiating between forensic and non-forensic evaluations, it has been found that malingering may be attempted in 15.7 percent of forensic evaluations and 7.4 percent of non-forensic evaluations. As mentioned above, personal injury lawsuits can motivate someone to malinger PTSD. It is thought that between 20 and 30 percent of these people seeking settlements have malingered their PTSD results. It is also believed that a minimum of 20 percent of veterans seeking combat compensation have malingered.

Cases within the criminal justice system also vary. A malingering rate between 8 percent and 17.4 percent was found in subjects in competency to stand trial assessments. Of incarcerated individuals seeking psychiatric services, a much higher range between 45 percent and 56 percent were suspected to malinger. Malingering cases were also positively correlated with severity of the crimes for subjects in competency to stand trial assessments. The incidence of malingering among individuals accused of murder or robbery is more than twice that of other subjects evaluated for competency.

== Motivation ==
Individuals who malinger PTSD may have several motivations for doing so. First, financial incentives are common. For example, the Department of Veterans Affairs offers substantial annual financial compensation to U.S. veterans who can prove that they have PTSD related to their military service. This potential compensation can create an incentive for veterans to malinger PTSD, especially in cases where financial instability or perceived injustice might drive individuals to falsify symptoms. Military personnel may avoid their military duty due to malingering PTSD, leading to a misuse of military resources, affecting unit readiness, and placing a greater burden on fellow service members. Furthermore, the U.S. Social Security Administration offers social security disability payments to individuals documenting a disorder such as PTSD that impedes their ability to work, which additionally provides an incentive to malinger PTSD. Additionally, the potential for workers compensation can motivate individuals reporting a traumatic event at their workplace to fabricate PTSD; and finally the potential for personal injury lawsuits can motivate someone to malinger PTSD and sue an individual for causing PTSD as a result of attack, accident or other stressor.

Some individuals are known to malinger PTSD to obtain inpatient hospital treatment. In such cases, individuals may manipulate the system to gain access to care that they believe they need or may do so to escape external responsibilities or difficulties. Persons charged in criminal law cases are motivated to malinger PTSD in order to offset criminal responsibility for the crime or mitigate the associated penalties; this not only complicates legal proceedings, but can undermine genuine cases of mental-health related defenses. In some cases, individuals may feign PTSD, particularly within military and combat settings, to seek accolades and recognition from their peers.

== Consequences ==
Malingering can significantly divert resources away from individuals who legitimately suffer from PTSD. This diversion not only delays and reduces their access to necessary treatments and support but also consumes resources and time that could be more effectively used for treating genuine cases. As a result, this can lead to inefficiencies and increased costs within healthcare and mental health systems. This can increase expenses and impact the availability and quality of mental health services. Malingering can complicate legal cases and insurance claims, which leads to higher litigation costs and delays in settlements.

Malingering cases can also lead to increased skepticism towards individuals claiming to have PTSD and contribute to the stigmatization of those with genuine PTSD. This may cause stress and anxiety due to the suspicion of malingering, thus exacerbating their symptoms. On a societal level, malingering can erode public trust in mental health and disability systems by increasing skepticism and resistance to supporting mental health initiatives.

Individuals who are found to be malingering may face legal consequences, including criminal charges, fines, or imprisonment. Individuals' reputations and credibility can be impacted along with their personal and professional lives. Those found malingering can deal with difficulties when taking legal actions or dealing with future claims.

== Psychological assessment findings ==
The Minnesota Multiphasic Personality Inventory-2 (MMPI-2) is a self-reported personality test which is the most widely used psychological assessment measure in research to detect malingered PTSD, typically by comparing genuine PTSD patients with individuals trained and instructed to fabricate PTSD on the MMPI-2. Numerous studies using the MMPI-2 have demonstrated a moderately accurate ability to detect feigned PTSD. Validity scales on the MMPI-2 that are reasonably accurate at detecting simulated PTSD include both the Fp scale developed by Paul Arbisi and Yosef Ben-Porath, and the Fptsd scale developed by Jon Elhai for combat survivors. These two scales have shown differing results. The Fp scale is the most helpful malingering predictor in civilian PTSD patients, whereas the Fptsd scale is a better predictor in combat PTSD patients.

The Symptom Validity Test (SVT) comprises two distinct measures designed to diagnose malingering PTSD and assess the credibility of reported PTSD symptoms. Studies show that SVTs are effective in distinguishing between genuine and feigned symptoms in various settings. The Performance Validity Test (PVT) evaluates the credibility of an individual's performance on cognitive or neuropsychological tests. PVTs are crucial for identifying instances where individuals may fabricate or exaggerate cognitive impairments related to PTSD. Additionally, PVTs are widely validated and used in various assessments by complementing other assessments tools by providing additional evidence.

While other psychological assessments, such as the Personality Assessment Inventory and Trauma Symptom Inventory have been explored for detecting PTSD malingering, none have matched the MMPI-2's accuracy rates. The current literature modestly supports the effectiveness of the Personality Assessment Inventory or PAI at detecting malingering of post-traumatic stress disorder or PTSD. Although results are mixed, the validity indicators of the PAI have been found to be effective at differentiating malingered PTSD from a diagnostically supported diagnosis of PTSD. Specifically, the negative impression management or NIM scale, the malingering index scale or MAL, and the negative distortion validity scale or NDS of the PAI are interpreted in detecting malingering of PTSD.

Using a combination of assessments is critical when evaluating PTSD malingering, rather than relying solely on a single test. A preliminary test which can be used is the Miller-Forensic Assessment of Symptoms (M-FAST). It can find 78 percent of test-takers asked to feign results and only takes between 5 and 10 minutes. Interviews hosted by clinicians are sometimes preferred over self-reported tests. These include the Clinician-Administered PTSD Scale (CAPS) or the Structured Interview of Reported Symptoms-2 (SIRS-2). Each of these include and interviewer who asks an interviewee a series of questions. The CAPS asks interviewees to rate items on a scale while the SIRS-2 may ask questions that could elicit a response that would expose malingering. The SIRS-2 has high accuracy in general malingering and PTSD malingering.

=== Limitations ===
Many studies on malingering PTSD focus on specific populations, mostly being veterans, which limits generalizability to more diverse groups. Most studies and research on malingering PTSD are concentrated in Western countries, specifically the United States. This overlooks other cultures and ethnicities.

Assessment tools for malingering like the MMPI-2, PAI, and other tests, vary in levels of accuracy depending on the context and population. The effectiveness of these tests differs, thus leading to potential inconsistencies in malingering detection. Some tools used to assess malingering PTSD may be outdated and some of the research articles have used these outdated tools for their research. These malingering PTSD assessments often involve subjective elements with self-reporting items. This subjectivity can impact the reliability and validity of malingering assessment.
