= Trauma Symptom Inventory =

The Trauma Symptom Inventory (TSI) is a psychological evaluation and assessment instrument that taps symptoms of post-traumatic stress disorder (PTSD) and other post-traumatic emotional problems. It was originally published in 1995 by its developer, John Briere. It is one of the most widely used measures of post-traumatic symptomatology.

The TSI is relatively unique in comparison to other measures of post-traumatic symptomatology, in that it is a multi-scale instrument, including 10 scales of various forms of clinical psychopathology related to psychological trauma. Also unique, it has three validity scales in order to assess the trauma victim's test-taking attitude, such as overreporting, underreporting and inconsistency. The TSI was not developed to detect the malingering of post-traumatic stress disorder, although clinicians have used it to do so. Research shows that the TSI serves as a general validity screen but should be used cautiously in detecting malingered PTSD.

Original psychometric data on the TSI demonstrated statistically adequate internal consistency (alphas ranging from .84 to .87). Validity with a civilian trauma-exposed sample has been demonstrated, with substantial relationships found between the TSI's clinical scale scores and other established measures of PTSD. Further corroboration of the TSI's psychometric properties, with trauma-exposed military veterans, was recently documented.

In 2011 a second edition of the TSI was published (TSI-2), Initial research demonstrated improved ability to detect simulated PTSD. Research in Sweden found the TSI-2 to be statistically sound and a good broad-spectrum assessment instrument.
