= Psychological injury =

Mental harm due to an act or negligence that may be legally compensable

A psychological injury is the psychological consequence of a traumatic event. Such an injury might result from events such as abusive behavior, whistleblower retaliation, bullying, kidnapping, rape, motor vehicular collision or other negligent action. It may cause impairments, disorders, and disabilities perhaps as an exacerbation of a pre-existing condition (e.g., Dalby, Maclean, & Nesca, 2022; Drogin, Dattilio, Sadoff, & Gutheil, 2011; Duckworth, Iezzi, & O'Donohue, 2008; Kane & Dvoskin, 2011; Koch, Douglas, Nicholls, & O'Neil, 2006; Schultz & Gatchel, 2009; Young, 2010, 2011; Young, Kane, & Nicholson, 2006, 2007).

Psychological injury is considered a mental harm, suffering, damage, impairment, or dysfunction caused to a person as a direct result of some action or failure to act by some individual. The psychological injury must cause a disturbance to the individual’s pre-existing psychological or psychiatric state to such a degree that it significantly interferes with their ability to function. If so, an individual may be able to sue for compensation/ damages.

Typically, a psychological injury may involve posttraumatic stress disorder (PTSD), traumatic brain injury (TBI), encephalitis, a concussion, chronic pain, or a disorder that involves mood or emotions (such as depression, anxiety, fear, or phobia, and adjustment disorder). These disorders may appear individually or together (co-morbidity). If the symptoms and their effects persist, the injured person may become a complainant or plaintiff, initiating legal action to seek compensation from the party deemed responsible for the injury.

== Diagnosis and treatment ==
Psychologists and psychiatrists are those professionals typically qualified by their regulating or licensing bodies or boards to diagnose and treat psychological injuries. Psychologists are trained in the study of behavior, including its assessment, diagnosis, and treatment. Many psychological tests are primarily administered by psychologists, as psychiatrists typically receive limited training in test administration and interpretation. However, being medical professionals, psychiatrists have skills and a knowledge base not typically available to psychologists. The Diagnostic and Statistical Manual of Mental Disorders—now in its fourth edition (DSM-IV-TR, American Psychiatric Association, 2000)—will soon be updated by a fifth edition slated for publication in 2013 (see Young and First, 2010, for a critique). This Manual is prepared under the aegis of the American Psychiatric Association, but psychologists contribute to this process by participating in its working groups.

Rehabilitation and other clinical psychologists—such as trauma psychologists—may be in professional contact with injured survivors at the onset injury, shortly thereafter, and throughout the course of recovery, such that these professionals, too, need to know about the legal ramifications of the field. They may employ cognitive behavioral approaches to help their patients deal with any physical injuries, pain experience, PTSD, mood, and effects of their brain injuries (Young, 2008b). They may assist the families of the injured, including spouses and children. They typically adopt a systems approach, working as part of rehabilitative teams. Their hardest cases occur when there is a death in the family as a result of the event for which legal action is involved and therapy is needed. These clinical, rehabilitation, and trauma psychologists refer to treatment guidelines in preparing their treatment plans, and attempt to keep their practices evidence-based when feasible.

== Major psychological injuries ==
=== Chronic pain ===
Chronic pain is another controversial psychological condition, labeled in the DSM-IV-TR as Pain Disorder Associated with Psychological Factors (with or without a Medical Condition). The "biopsychosocial approach" recognizes the influence of psychological factors (e.g., stress) on pain. It was once thought that chronic pain could be the result of a "pain-prone personality" or that it is "all in the head." Contemporary research tends to dismiss such conceptualizations, but they continue persist and cause distress to patients whose pain is not recognized as real. Psychologists have an important role to play in helping patients in pain by providing appropriate education and treatment (for example, about catastrophizing or fearing the worst), and by using standard cognitive and behavioral techniques (such as breathing exercises, muscle relaxation, and dealing with cognitive distortions) (see Gatchel, Peng, Fuchs, Peters, and Turk, 2007; Schatman and Gatchel, 2010).

=== Traumatic brain injury (TBI) ===
TBI refers to mild to severe pathophysiological effects in the brain and central nervous system due to strong impacts, such as severe blows to the head and penetrating wounds that might take place in accidents and other events at claim. Neuropsychological deficits associated with TBI include those relating to memory, concentration, attention, processing speed, reasoning, problem solving, planning, and inhibitory control. When these effects persist, other psychological difficulties might arise, even in mild cases (such as concussions). However, the underlying reason for the perpetuation of the symptoms beyond the expected time frame might be due to associated factors, such as poor sleep, fatigue, pain, headaches, and distress. Psychologists can help patients with TBI by guiding them in cognitive remediation and dealing with family. When the effects are serious and even devastating, the degree of care from the team may be intensive, covering multiple aspects of daily living (see Ruff and Richards, 2009).

People of both sexes and all types of backgrounds, races, ages, and disability status are injured physically and psychologically in events at claim and in other situations. However, the research does not always consider these differences, and often the diagnostic manuals, psychological tests, and therapeutic protocols in use in the area also lack differentiation along these lines.

== Disability and return to work ==
When psychological injuries compromise daily activities, psychologists need to address the degree of disability (see Schultz, 2009; Schultz & Rogers, 2011). Patients express symptoms that might be accurately diagnosed as PTSD, Pain Disorder, and/or TBI. However, the critical issue is the degree of impairment, limitation, and participation restriction in daily activities in which patients would normally participate at work, at home, in childcare, and in schooling. When the patient cannot undertake the functions involved in these important roles, the psychologist or other mental health professional may conclude that a disability is present, but this cannot be ascertained by the mere presence of a diagnosis of one sort or another. Rather, the psychologist must demonstrate that the person is disabled from the essential duties, tasks, or activities of the role at issue. For example, a forefinger injury leading to chronic pain might mean relatively little to an investment banker—as long as medications control it and other areas of functioning are not greatly affected—but might be devastating to a violinist. Psychologists may refer to the American Medical Association's Guides to the Evaluation of Permanent Impairment (Rondinelli, Genovese, Katz, Mayer, Müller, Ranavaya, & Brigham, 2008) in arriving at disability determinations, which addresses mental health, neuropsychological, and pain issues. However, like the DSM-IV-TR, this compendium is sometimes questioned for its scientific validity and usefulness.

Tort actions and other civil actions are often based on serious, permanent and important psychological injuries that create disabilities of a substantial nature in other areas, such as leisure activities, home care, and family life. Often, psychologists in court lock horns over the degree to which the event at claim and its psychological effects have created serious and potentially permanent psychological disabilities—in part, because there is no one test that can measure "disability," per se.

Treating psychologists try to help clients return to work (RTW) or to their other functional roles and activities of daily living (ADLs). Clients are expected to adhere to treatment regimens, or be compliant with treatment recommendations. Partly, this serves to mitigate their losses, or attempt to return to their pre-event physical and psychological condition. When they reach or are progressing to their maximum medical recovery (physical and psychological/ psychiatric recovery), RTW might be attempted on a modified, part-time, or accommodated basis, and treatment might continue to help full re-integration into the workforce or other daily roles, and to maintain gains and avoid deterioration. Or, clients might be sent for training or education, based on their transferable skills residual to the event at claim and its effects. For those who do not make full recovery and remain disabled because of their permanent barriers to recovery, the goals of rehabilitation include optimizing adjustment, quality of life (QOL), residual functionality, and wellness.

== Psychological testing ==
Psychologists need to use the most appropriate tests available for detecting the person(s) responsible for the psychological injury. In addition, psychologists need to be able to arrive at scientifically informed conclusions in their evaluations that will withstand the rigors of scrutiny by psychologists on the opposing side and of cross-examination in court.

In terms of their education and training, psychologists need to be able to address the full array of areas under discussion, especially in forensic, rehabilitation, and trauma areas. They must become experts in assessment and testing, especially regarding (a) personality tests (e.g., the MMPI-2; Butcher, Dahlstrom, Graham, Tellegen, & Kaemmer, 1989; Butcher, Graham, Ben-Porath, Tellegen, Dahlstrom, & Kaemmer, 2001; and the revision the MMPI-2 RF; Ben-Porath & Tellegen, 2008; as well as the PAI; Morey, 2007), and their embedded validity scales, such as the F family of scales in the MMPI tests, and (b) stand-alone symptom validity tests (e.g., the TOMM; Tombaugh, 1996; WMT; Green, 2005; SIRS; Rogers, Bagby, & Dickens, 1992; and the revision SIRS-2; Rogers, Sewell, & Gillard, 2010). The key factors in the development of tests that are acceptable to psychologists and to court is that the tests should have acceptable psychometric properties, such as reliability and validity. Also, such tests must be standardized by using populations that make sense for the area of psychological injuries, such as accident survivors experiencing pain and other trauma victims.

== See also ==
- Causality
- Forensic psychiatry
- Forensic psychology
- Evidence (Law)
- Expert witness
- Malingering
- Chronic pain syndrome
- Personal injury
- Psychological Injury and Law
- Rehabilitation
- Tort
- Traumatic brain injury complications
