= Therapeutic assessment =

Method of resolving issues

Therapeutic assessment is a psychological assessment procedure which aims to help people gain insight and apply this new insight to problems in their life. This paradigm is contrasted with the traditional, information-gathering model of psychological assessment, the main goal of which is to accurately diagnose, plan treatments, and evaluate treatment effectiveness. Traditional, information-gathering assessment is sometimes viewed as the phase before treatment, whereas therapeutic assessment can be considered the first phase of treatment or as a brief standalone treatment. The term 'Therapeutic Assessment' was coined in 1993 by Stephen E. Finn to describe the semi-structured collaborative assessment paradigm developed by himself and colleagues at the Center for Therapeutic Assessment in Austin, Texas. Finn suggests differentiating the capitalized "Therapeutic Assessment" or the abbreviation, "TA" as the paradigm developed by himself and his colleagues and the lowercase "therapeutic assessment" as the more general term which describes a variety of humanistically based assessment models.

== Research ==
Results of research on therapeutic assessment show that subjects who received therapeutic assessment as opposed to controls (only examiner attention or test without feedback) reported a significant decline in symptomatic distress as well as significant increases in self-esteem and hopefulness, both immediately following the feedback session and at a 2-week follow-up. Research on therapeutic alliance suggests that the use of therapeutic assessment results in a more positive client/assessor relationship than the traditional information-gathering model, which researchers suggest may lead to a decreased therapy drop-out rate. Research has also found that the gains in therapeutic alliance due to therapeutic assessment are related to significantly more positive alliances throughout treatment. A meta-analysis of studies using various forms of assessment as a therapeutic intervention (including TA as outlined by Finn) found that these groups had significantly better outcomes than control or comparison groups. Researchers have also begun to examine therapeutic assessment for children and families, and have demonstrated clinical effectiveness in many settings, including schools, children's hospitals, and various clinics.

== Training ==
The Therapeutic Assessment Institute (TAI) offers three levels of training for clinicians interested in Therapeutic Assessment, including introductory workshops, intermediate workshops, and advanced training. Stephen E. Finn has also authored a manual on Therapeutic Assessment using the Minnesota Multiphasic Personality Inventory-2 (MMPI-2) which breaks the process into three steps. The three steps are the initial interview, preparing for the feedback session (which includes interpreting the MMPI-2 profile), and the feedback session.

== See also ==
- Clinical formulation
