= Military Acute Concussion Evaluation =

Medical diagnosis

- Purpose: gauge severity of concussion

The Military Acute Concussion Evaluation (MACE) is an American medical screening and documentation measure that is used to gauge the severity of symptoms and cognitive deficits after a diagnosis of a concussion has been made. Taking less than 15 minutes to administer, it involves collecting a history of the injury event and the symptoms experienced at that time, followed by a brief neurological screening, and a similarly short cognitive test. The score is presented with a listing of symptoms endorsed and a red or green light regarding the neurological screen. All cases of a concussion result in mandatory restricted duty for 24 hours followed by immediate reevaluation via the MACE. Similarly, the MACE is most effective if given within 24 hours of the injury event to fully gauge the level of possible brain injury. The MACE has been distributed to all branches of the US military. It is currently used in DVBIC and the US Department of Veterans Affairs (VA) Veterans Health Administration are partners in clinical care, education, research and care coordination for veterans and active-duty service members who have sustained a traumatic brain injury.

== See also ==
- Veterans Traumatic Brain Injury Care Improvement Act
