= Psychological evaluation =

Method to assess several psychological aspects of an individual

Psychological evaluation is a method to assess an individual's behavior, personality, cognitive abilities, and several other domains. (Note: The phrases "psychological evaluation" and "psychological assessment" seem to be used interchangeably. For example, the American Psychological Association (APA) Dictionary does not define "psychological evaluation", but it defines "psychological assessment" as "the gathering and integration of data to evaluate a person's behavior, abilities, and other characteristics, particularly for the purposes of making a diagnosis or treatment recommendation" (emphasis added). An article on the APA website titled, "Understanding psychological testing and assessment", explains: "Psychological evaluations serve the same purpose [as medical tests]. Psychologists use tests and other assessment tools to measure and observe a patient's behavior to arrive at a diagnosis and guide treatment" (emphasis added).) A common reason for a psychological evaluation is to identify psychological factors that may be inhibiting a person's ability to think, behave, or regulate emotion functionally or constructively. It is the mental equivalent of physical examination. Other psychological evaluations seek to better understand the individual's unique characteristics or personality to predict things like workplace performance or customer relationship management.

== History ==
Modern psychological evaluation has been around for roughly 200 years, with roots that stem as far back as 2200 B.C. It started in China, and many psychologists throughout Europe worked to develop methods of testing into the 1900s. The first tests focused on aptitude. Eventually scientists tried to gauge mental processes in patients with brain damage, then children with special needs.

=== Ancient psychological evaluation ===
Earliest accounts of evaluation are seen as far back as 2200 B.C. when Chinese emperors were assessed to determine their fitness for office. These rudimentary tests were developed over time until 1370 A.D. when an understanding of classical Confucianism was introduced as a testing mechanism. As a preliminary evaluation for anyone seeking public office, candidates were required to spend one day and one night in a small space composing essays and writing poetry over assigned topics. Only the top 1% to 7% were selected for higher evaluations, which required three separate session of three days and three nights performing the same tasks. This process continued for one more round until a final group emerged, comprising less than 1% of the original group, became eligible for public office. The Chinese failure to validate their selection procedures, along with widespread discontent over such grueling processes, resulted in the eventual abolishment of the practice by royal decree.

=== Development of psychological evaluation in 1800-1900-s ===
In the 1800s, Hubert von Grashey developed a battery to determine the abilities of brain-damaged patients. This test was also not favorable, as it took over 100 hours to administer. However, this influenced Wilhelm Wundt, who had the first psychological laboratory in Germany. His tests were shorter, but used similar techniques. Wundt also measured mental processes and acknowledged the fact that there are individual differences between people.

Francis Galton established the first tests in London for measuring IQ. He tested thousands of people, examining their physical characteristics as a basis for his results and many of the records remain today. James Cattell studied with him, and eventually worked on his own with brass instruments for evaluation. His studies led to his paper "Mental Tests and Measurements", one of the most famous writings on psychological evaluation. He also coined the term "mental test" in this paper.

As the 1900s began, Alfred Binet was also studying evaluation. However, he was more interested in distinguishing children with special needs from their peers after he could not prove in his other research that magnets could cure hysteria. He did his research in France, with the help of Theodore Simon. They created a list of questions that were used to determine if children would receive regular instruction, or would participate in special education programs. Their battery was continually revised and developed, until 1911 when the Binet-Simon questionnaire was finalized for different age levels.

After Binet's death, intelligence testing was further studied by Charles Spearman. He theorized that intelligence was made up of several different subcategories, which were all interrelated. He combined all the factors together to form a general intelligence, which he abbreviated as "g". This led to William Stern's idea of an intelligence quotient. He believed that children of different ages should be compared to their peers to determine their mental age in relation to their chronological age. Lewis Terman combined the Binet-Simon questionnaire with the intelligence quotient and the result was the standard test we use today, with an average score of 100.

The large influx of non-English speaking immigrants into the US brought about a change in psychological testing that relied heavily on verbal skills for subjects that were not literate in English, or had speech/hearing difficulties. In 1913, R.H. Sylvester standardized the first non-verbal psychological test. In this particular test, participants fit different shaped blocks into their respective slots on a Seguin form board. From this test, Knox developed a series of non-verbal psychological tests that he used while working at the Ellis Island immigrant station in 1914. In his tests, were a simple wooden puzzle as well as digit-symbol substitution test where each participant saw digits paired up with a particular symbol, they were then shown the digits and had to write in the symbol that was associated with it.

When the United States moved into World War I, Robert M. Yerkes convinced the government that they should be testing all of the recruits they were receiving into the Army. The results of the tests could be used to make sure that the "mentally incompetent" and "mentally exceptional" were assigned to appropriate jobs. Yerkes and his colleagues developed the Army Alpha and Army Beta tests to use on all new recruits. These tests set a precedent for the development of psychological testing for the next several decades.

After seeing the success of the Army standardized tests, college administration quickly picked up on the idea of group testing to decide entrance into their institutions. The College Entrance Examination Board was created to test applicants to colleges across the nation. In 1925, they developed tests that were no longer essay tests that were very open to interpretation, but now were objective tests that were also the first to be scored by machine. These early tests evolved into modern day College Board tests, like the Scholastic Assessment Test, Graduate Record Examination, and the Law School Admissions Test.

== Formal and informal evaluation ==
Formal psychological evaluation consists of standardized batteries of tests and highly structured clinician-run interviews, while informal evaluation takes on a completely different tone. In informal evaluation, assessments are based on unstructured, free-flowing interviews or observations that allow both the patient and the clinician to guide the content. Both of these methods have their pros and cons. A highly unstructured interview and informal observations provide key findings about the patient that are both efficient and effective. A potential issue with an unstructured, informal approach is the clinician may overlook certain areas of functioning or not notice them at all. Or they might focus too much on presenting complaints. The highly structured interview, although very precise, can cause the clinician to make the mistake of focusing a specific answer to a specific question without considering the response in terms of a broader scope or life context. They may fail to recognize how the patient's answers all fit together.

There are many ways that the issues associated with the interview process can be mitigated. The benefits to more formal standardized evaluation types such as batteries and tests are many. First, they measure a large number of characteristics simultaneously. These include personality, cognitive, or neuropsychological characteristics. Second, these tests provide empirically quantified information. The obvious benefit to this is that we can more precisely measure patient characteristics as compared to any kind of structured or unstructured interview. Third, all of these tests have a standardized way of being scored and being administered. Each patient is presented a standardized stimulus that serves as a benchmark that can be used to determine their characteristics. These types of tests eliminate any possibility of bias and produce results that could be harmful to the patient and cause legal and ethical issues. Fourth, tests are normed. This means that patients can be assessed not only based on their comparison to a "normal" individual, but how they compare to the rest of their peers who may have the same psychological issues that they face. Normed tests allow the clinician to make a more individualized assessment of the patient. Fifth, standardized tests that we commonly use today are both valid and reliable. We know what specific scores mean, how reliable they are, and how the results will affect the patient.

Most clinicians agree that a balanced battery of tests is the most effective way of helping patients. Clinicians should not become victims of blind adherence to any one particular method. A balanced battery of tests allows there to be a mix of formal testing processes that allow the clinician to start making their assessment, while conducting more informal, unstructured interviews with the same patient may help the clinician to make more individualized evaluations and help piece together what could potentially be a very complex, unique-to-the-individual kind of issue or problem .

== Modern uses ==
Psychological assessment is most often used in the psychiatric, medical, legal, educational, or psychological clinic settings. The types of assessments and the purposes for them differ among these settings.

In the psychiatric setting, the common needs for assessment are to determine risks, whether a person should be admitted or discharged, the location the patients should be held, as well as what therapy the patient should be receiving. Within this setting, the psychologists need to be aware of the legal responsibilities that what they can legally do in each situation.

Within a medical setting, psychological assessment is used to find a possible underlying psychological disorder, emotional factors that may be associated with medical complaints, assessment for neuropsychological deficit, psychological treatment for chronic pain, and the treatment of chemical dependency. There has been greater importance placed on the patient's neuropsychological status as neuropsychologists are becoming more concerned with the functioning of the brain.

Psychological assessment also has a role in the legal setting. Psychologists might be asked to assess the reliability of a witness, the quality of the testimony a witness gives, the competency of an accused person, or determine what might have happened during a crime. They also may help support a plea of insanity or to discount a plea. Judges may use the psychologist's report to change the sentence of a convicted person, and parole officers work with psychologists to create a program for the rehabilitation of a parolee. Problematic areas for psychologists include predicting how dangerous a person will be. The predictive accuracy of these assessments is debated; however, there is often a need for this prediction to prevent dangerous people from returning to society.

Psychologists may also be called on to assess a variety of things within an education setting. They may be asked to assess strengths and weaknesses of children who are having difficulty in the school systems, assess behavioral difficulties, assess a child's responsiveness to an intervention, or to help create an educational plan for a child. The assessment of children also allows for the psychologists to determine if the child will be willing to use the resources that may be provided or if conditions such as obsessive-compulsive disorder may be present.

In a psychological clinic setting, psychological assessment can be used to determine characteristics of the client that can be useful for developing a treatment plan. Within this setting, psychologists often are working with clients who may have medical or legal problems or sometimes students who were referred to this setting from their school psychologist.

Some psychological assessments have been validated for use when administered via computer or the Internet. However, caution must be applied to these test results, as it is possible to fake in electronically mediated assessment. Many electronic assessments do not truly measure what is claimed, such as the Meyers-Briggs personality test. Although one of the most well known personality assessments, it has been found both invalid and unreliable by many psychological researches, and should be used with caution.

Within clinical psychology, the "clinical method" is an approach to understanding and treating mental disorders that begins with a particular individual's personal history and is designed around that individual's psychological needs. It is sometimes posed as an alternative approach to the experimental method which focuses on the importance of conducting experiments in learning how to treat mental disorders, and the differential method which sorts patients by class (gender, race, income, age, etc.) and designs treatment plans based around broad social categories.

Taking a personal history along with clinical examination allow the health practitioners to fully establish a clinical diagnosis. A medical history of a patient provides insights into diagnostic possibilities as well as the patient's experiences with illnesses. The patients will be asked about current illness and the history of it, past medical history and family history, other drugs or dietary supplements being taken, lifestyle, and allergies. The inquiry includes obtaining information about relevant diseases or conditions of other people in their family. Self-reporting methods may be used, including questionnaires, structured interviews and rating scales.

== Personality Assessment ==
Personality traits are an individual's enduring manner of perceiving, feeling, evaluating, reacting, and interacting with other people specifically, and with their environment more generally. Because reliable and valid personality inventories give a relatively accurate representation of a person's characteristics, they are beneficial in the clinical setting as supplementary material to standard initial assessment procedures such as a clinical interview; review of collateral information, e.g., reports from family members; and review of psychological and medical treatment records.

=== MMPI ===
==== History ====
Developed by Starke R. Hathaway, PhD, and J. C. McKinley, MD, The Minnesota Multiphasic Personality Inventory (MMPI) is a personality inventory used to investigate not only personality, but also psychopathology. The MMPI was developed using an empirical, atheoretical approach. This means that it was not developed using any of the frequently changing theories about psychodynamics at the time. There are two variations of the MMPI administered to adults, the MMPI-2 and the MMPI-2-RF, and two variations administered to teenagers, the MMPI-A and MMPI-A-RF. This inventory's validity has been confirmed by Hiller, Rosenthal, Bornstein, and Berry in their 1999 meta-analysis. Throughout history the MMPI in its various forms has been routinely administered in hospitals, clinical settings, prisons, and military settings.

==== MMPI-2 ====
The MMPI-2 consists of 567 true or false questions aimed at measuring the reporting person's psychological wellbeing. The MMPI-2 is commonly used in clinical settings and occupational health settings. There is a revised version of the MMPI-2 called the MMPI-2-RF (MMPI-2 Restructured Form). The MMPI-2-RF is not intended to be a replacement for the MMPI-2, but is used to assess patients using the most current models of psychopathology and personality.

MMPI-2 and MMPI-2-RF Scales
Version	Number of Items	Number of Scales	Scale Categories
MMPI-2	567	120	Validity Indicators, Superlative Self-Presentation Subscales, Clinical Scales, Restructured Clinical (RC) Scales, Content Scales, Content Component Scales, Supplementary Scales, Clinical Subscales (Harris-Lingoes and Social Introversion Subscales)
MMPI-2-RF	338	51	Validity, Higher-Order (H-O), Restructured Clinical (RC), Somatic, Cognitive, Internalizing, Externalizing, Interpersonal, Interest, Personality Psychopathology Five (PSY-5)

==== MMPI-A ====
The MMPI-A was published in 1992 and consists of 478 true or false questions. This version of the MMPI is similar to the MMPI-2 but used for adolescents (age 14–18) rather than for adults. The restructured form of the MMPI-A, the MMPI-A-RF, was published in 2016 and consists of 241 true or false questions that can be understood with a sixth grade reading level. Both the MMPI-A and MMPI-A-RF are used to assess adolescents for personality and psychological disorders, as well as to evaluate cognitive processes.

MMPI-A and MMPI-A-RF Scales
Verson	Number of Items	Number of Scales	Scale Categories
MMPI-A	478	105	Validity Indicators, Clinical Scales, Clinical Subscales (Harris-Lingoes and Social Introversion Subscales), Content Scales, Content Component Scales, Supplementary Scales
MMPI-A-RF	241	48	Validity, Higher-Order (H-O), Restructured Clinical (RC), Somatic/Cognitive, Internalizing, Externalizing, Interpersonal, Personality Psychopathology Five (PSY-5)

=== NEO Personality Inventory ===
The NEO Personality Inventory was developed by Paul Costa Jr. and Robert R. McCrae in 1978. When initially created, it only measured three of the Big Five personality traits: Neuroticism, Openness to Experience, and Extroversion. The inventory was then renamed as the Neuroticism-Extroversion-Openness Inventory (NEO-I). It was not until 1985 that Agreeableness and Conscientiousness were added to the personality assessment. With all Big Five personality traits being assessed, it was then renamed as the NEO Personality Inventory. Research for the NEO-PI continued over the next few years until a revised manual with six facets for each Big Five trait was published in 1992. In the 1990s, now called the NEO PI-R, issues were found with the personality inventory. The developers of the assessment found it to be too difficult for younger people, and another revision was done to create the NEO PI-3.

The NEO Personality Inventory is administered in two forms: self-report and observer report. It consists of 240 personality items and a validity item. It can be administered in roughly 35–45 minutes. Every item is answered on a Likert scale, widely known as a scale from Strongly Disagree to Strongly Agree. If more than 40 items are missing or more than 150 responses or less than 50 responses are Strongly Agree/Disagree, the assessment should be viewed with great caution and has the potential to be invalid. In the NEO report, each trait's T score is recorded along with the percentile they rank on compared to all data recorded for the assessment. Then, each trait is broken up into their six facets along with raw score, individual T-scores, and percentile. The next page goes on to list what each score means in words as well as what each facet entails. The exact responses to questions are given in a list as well as the validity response and amount of missing responses.

When an individual is given their NEO report, it is important to understand specifically what the facets are and what the corresponding scores mean.

- Neuroticism
  - Anxiety
    - High scores suggest nervousness, tenseness, and fearfulness. Low scores suggest feeling relaxed and calm.
  - Angry Hostility
    - High scores suggest feeling anger and frustration often. Low scores suggest being easy-going.
  - Depression
    - High scores suggest feeling guilty, sad, hopeless, and lonely. Low scores suggest less feeling of that of someone who scores highly, but not necessarily being light-hearted and cheerful.
  - Self-consciousness
    - High scores suggest shame, embarrassment, and sensitivity. Low scores suggest being less affected by others' opinions, but not necessarily having good social skills or poise.
  - Impulsiveness
    - High scores suggest the inability to control cravings and urges. Low scores suggest easy resistance to such urges.
  - Vulnerability
    - High scores suggest inability to cope with stress, being dependent, and feeling panicked in high stress situations. Low scores suggest capability to handle stressful situations.
- Extraversion
  - Warmth
    - High scores suggest friendliness and affectionate behavior. Low scores suggest being more formal, reserved, and distant. A low score does not necessarily mean being hostile or lacking compassion.
  - Gregariousness
    - High scores suggest wanting the company of others. Low scores tend to be from those who avoid social stimulation.
  - Assertiveness
    - High scores suggest a forceful and dominant person who lacks hesitation. Low scores suggest are more passive and try not to stand out in a crowd.
  - Activity
    - High scores suggest a more energetic and upbeat personality and lead a quicker paced lifestyle. Low scores suggest the person is more leisurely, but does not imply being lazy or slow.
  - Excitement-Seeking
    - High scores suggest a person who seeks and craves excitement and is similar to those with high sensation seeking. Low scores seek a less exciting lifestyle and come off more boring.
  - Positive Emotions
    - High scores suggest the tendency to feel happier, laugh more, and are optimistic. Low scorers are not necessarily unhappy, but more so are less high-spirited and are more pessimistic.
- Openness to Experience
  - Fantasy
    - Those who score high in fantasy have a more creative imagination and daydream frequently. Low scores suggest a person who lives more in the moment.
  - Aesthetics
    - High scores suggest a love and appreciation for art and physical beauty. These people are more emotionally attached to music, artwork, and poetry. Low scorers have a lack of interest in the arts.
  - Feelings
    - High scorers have a deeper ability to experience emotion and see their emotions as more important than those who score low on this facet. Low scorers are less expressive.
  - Actions
    - High scores suggest a more open-mindedness to traveling and experiencing new things. These people prefer novelty over a routine life. Low scorers prefer a scheduled life and dislike change.
  - Ideas
    - Active pursuit of knowledge, high curiosity, and the enjoyment of brain teasers and philosophical are common of those who score high on this facet. Those who score lower are not necessarily less intelligent, nor does a high score imply high intelligence. However, those who score lower are more narrow in their interests and have low curiosity.
  - Values
    - High scorers are more investigative of political, social, and religious values. Those who score lower and more accepting of authority and honor more traditional values. High scorers are more typically liberal while lower scorers are more typically conservative.
- Agreeableness
  - Trust
    - High scores are more trusting of others and believe others are honest and have good intentions. Low scorers are more skeptical, cynical, and assumes others are dishonest and/or dangerous.
  - Straightforwardness
    - Those who score high in this facet are more sincere and frank. Low scorers are more deceitful and more willing to manipulate others, but this does not mean they should be labeled as a dishonest or manipulative person.
  - Altruism
    - High scores suggest a person concerned with the well-being of others and show it through generosity, willingness to help others, and volunteering for those less fortunate. Low scores suggest a more self-centered person who is less willing to go out of their way to help others.
  - Compliance
    - High scorers are more inclined to avoid conflict and tend to forgive easily. Low scores suggest a more aggressive personality and a love for competition.
  - Modesty
    - High scorers are more humble, but not necessarily lacking in self-esteem or confidence. Low scorers believe they're more superior than others and may come off as more conceited.
  - Tender-Mindedness
    - This facet scales one's concern for others and their ability to empathize. High scorers are more moved by others' emotions, while low scorers are more hardheaded and typically consider themselves realists.
- Conscientiousness
  - Competence
    - High scores suggest one is capable, sensible, prudent, effective, and are well-prepared to deal with whatever happens in life. Low scores suggest a potential lower self-esteem and are often unprepared.
  - Order
    - High scorers are more neat and tidy, while low scorers lack organization and are unmethodical.
  - Dutifulness
    - Those who score highly in this facet are more strict about their ethical principles and are more dependable. Low scorers are less reliable and are more casual about their morals.
  - Achievement Striving
    - Those who score highly in this facet have higher aspirations and work harder to achieve their goals. However, they may be too invested in their work and become a workaholic. Low scorers are much less ambitious and perhaps even lazy. They are often content with their lack of goal-seeking.
  - Self-Discipline
    - High scorers complete whatever task is assigned to them and are self-motivated. Low scorers often procrastinate and are easily discouraged.
  - Deliberation
    - High scorers tend to think more than low scorers before acting. High scorers are more cautious and deliberate while low scorers are more hasty and act without considering the consequences.

=== HEXACO-PI ===
The HEXACO-PI, developed by Lee and Ashton in the early 2000s, is a personality inventory used to measure six different dimensions of personality which have been found in lexical studies across various cultures. There are two versions of the HEXACO: the HEXACO-PI and the HEXACO-PI-R which are examined with either self reports or observer reports. The HEXACO-PI-R has forms of three lengths: 200 items, 100 items, and 60 items. Items from each form are grouped to measure scales of more narrow personality traits, which are them grouped into broad scales of the six dimensions: honesty & humility (H), emotionality (E), Extraversion (X), agreeableness (A), conscientiousness (C), and openness to experience (O).The HEXACO-PI-R includes various traits associated with neuroticism and can be used to help identify trait tendencies. One table which give examples of typically high loaded adjectives on the six factors of HEXACO can be found in Ashton's book "Individual Differences and Personality"

Adjective relating to the six factors within the HEXACO structure
Personality Factor	Narrow Personality Traits	Related Adjectives
Honesty-Humility	Sincerity, fairness, greed-avoidance, modesty	Sincere, honest, faithful/loyal, modest/unassuming, fair-minded versus sly, deceitful, greedy, pretentious, hypocritical, boastful, pompous
Emotionality	Fearfulness, anxiety, depenence, sentimentality	Emotional, oversensitive, sentimental, fearful, anxious, vulnerable versus brave, tough, independent, self-assured, stable
Extraversion	Social self-esteem, social boldness, sociability, liveliness	Outgoing, lively, extraverted, sociable, talkative, cheerful, active versus shy, passive, withdrawn, introverted, quiet, reserved
Agreeableness	Forgivingness, gentleness, flexibility, patience	Patient, tolerant, peaceful, mild, agreeable, lenient, gentle versus ill-tempered, quarrelsome, stubborn, choleric
Conscientiousness	Organization, diligence, perfectionism, prudence	Organized, disciplined, diligent, careful, thorough, precise verus sloppy, negligent, reckless, lazy, irresponsible, absent-minded
Openness to Experience	Aesthetic appreciation, inquisitiveness, creativity, unconventionality	Intellectual, creative, unconventional, innovative, ironic versus shallow, unimaginative, conventional

One benefit of using the HEXACO is that of the facet of neuroticism within the factor of emotionality: trait neuroticism has been shown to have a moderate positive correlation with people with anxiety and depression. The identification of trait neuroticism on a scale, paired with anxiety, and/or depression is beneficial in a clinical setting for introductory screenings some personality disorders. Because the HEXACO has facets which help identify traits of neuroticism, it is also a helpful indicator of the dark triad.

== Temperament Assessment ==
In contrast to personality, i.e. the concept that relates to culturally- and socially-influenced behaviour and cognition, the concept of temperament' refers to biologically and neurochemically-based individual differences in behaviour. Unlike personality, temperament is relatively independent of learning, system of values, national, religious and gender identity and attitudes. There are multiple tests for evaluation of temperament traits (reviewed, for example, in, majority of which were developed arbitrarily from opinions of early psychologists and psychiatrists but not from biological sciences. There are only two temperament tests that were based on neurochemical hypotheses: The Temperament and Character Inventory (TCI) and the Trofimova's Structure of Temperament Questionnaire-Compact (STQ-77). The STQ-77 is based on the neurochemical framework Functional Ensemble of Temperament that summarizes the contribution of main neurochemical (neurotransmitter, hormonal and opioid) systems to behavioural regulation. The STQ-77 assesses 12 temperament traits linked to the neurochemical components of the FET. The STQ-77 is freely available for non-commercial use in 24 languages for testing in adults and several language versions for testing children

== Pseudopsychology (pop psychology) in assessment ==
Although there have been many great advancements in the field of psychological evaluation, some issues have also developed. One of the main problems in the field is pseudopsychology, also called pop psychology. Psychological evaluation is one of the biggest aspects in pop psychology. In a clinical setting, patients are not aware that they are not receiving correct psychological treatment, and that belief is one of the main foundations of pseudopsychology. It is largely based upon the testimonies of previous patients, the avoidance of peer review (a critical aspect of any science), and poorly set up tests, which can include confusing language or conditions that are left up to interpretation.

Pseudopsychology can also occur when people claim to be psychologists, but lack qualifications. A prime example of this is found in quizzes that can lead to a variety of false conclusions. These can be found in magazines, online, or just about anywhere accessible to the public. They usually consist of a small number of questions designed to tell the participant things about themselves. These often have no research or evidence to back up any claims made by the quizzes.

== Ethics ==
Concerns about privacy, cultural biases, tests that have not been validated, and inappropriate contexts have led groups such as the American Educational Research Association (AERA) and the American Psychological Association (APA) to publish guidelines for examiners in regards to assessment. The American Psychological Association states that a client must give permission to release any of the information that may come from a psychologist. The only exceptions to this are in the case of minors, when the clients are a danger to themselves or others, or if they are applying for a job that requires this information. Also, the issue of privacy occurs during the assessment itself. The client has the right to say as much or little as they would like, however they may feel the need to say more than they want or even may accidentally reveal information they would like to keep private.

Guidelines have been put in place to ensure the psychologist giving the assessments maintains a professional relationship with the client since their relationship can impact the outcomes of the assessment. The examiner's expectations may also influence the client's performance in the assessments.

The validity and reliability of the tests being used also can affect the outcomes of the assessments being used. When psychologists are choosing which assessments they are going to use, they should pick one that will be most effective for what they are looking at. Also, it is important for the psychologists are aware of the possibility of the client, either consciously or unconsciously, faking answers and consider use of tests that have validity scales within them.

== See also ==
- Corresponding evaluations in related fields
  - Neuropsychological assessment
  - Neurological examination in neurology
  - Mental state examination in psychiatry
  - Physical examination in medicine
- Therapeutic assessment
