= Psychological Injury and Law =

Peer-reviewed psychology and law academic journal

- Discipline: Forensic psychology
- Language: English
- Edited by: Gerald Young

Publication details
- History: 2008-present
- Publisher: Springer Science+Business Media
- Frequency: Quarterly
- Open access: Hybrid

Standard abbreviations
- ISO 4: Psychol. Inj. Law

Indexing
- ISSN: 1938-971X (print); 1938-9728 (web)
- LCCN: 2007214481
- OCLC no.: 150537582

Links
- Journal homepage; Online access

Psychological Injury and Law is a quarterly peer-reviewed academic journal published by Springer Science+Business Media since 2008. As of 2023 the editor-in-chief is Gerald Young (York University).

The journal covers forensic psychology, especially the interface of psychological injury and the law, such as psychological evaluations of psychological trauma in personal injury lawsuits; workers compensation claims, or legal considerations for expert opinions in U.S. veterans disability cases.

== Abstracting and indexing ==
The journal is abstracted and indexed in Scopus, PsycINFO, HeinOnline, Emerging Sources Citation Index, and Academic OneFile.
