= J. C. McKinley =

American physician

John Charnley McKinley
- Born: Duluth, Minnesota
- Education: University of Minnesota
- Medical career
- Profession: Physician
- Field: Neurology
- Institutions: University of Minnesota
- Research: Minnesota Multiphasic Personality Inventory
- Awards: Guggenheim Fellowship

John Charnley McKinley (November 8, 1891 - January 3, 1950) was an American neurologist who co-authored the psychological assessment known as the Minnesota Multiphasic Personality Inventory (MMPI). He was educated at the University of Minnesota, where he spent almost all of his academic career.

== Biography ==
McKinley was born on November 8, 1891, in Duluth, Minnesota. Throughout his education and his career in academia, he spent almost all of that time at the University of Minnesota. He graduated from medical school there in 1919 and later earned a PhD.

He was the university's first full-time faculty member who specialized in neurology. In 1928, McKinley received a Guggenheim Fellowship to study medicine at the University of Breslau in Germany. Spending a year in Germany, he used electromyography to quantitatively study human muscle tonus in human subjects.

With his Minnesota colleague Starke R. Hathaway, he created the Minnesota Multiphasic Personality Inventory (MMPI), which was first published in 1943. Originally, Hathaway and McKinley intended that the test would detect the personality characteristics associated with psychiatric disability. However, the test has also been widely employed with normal populations as well.

McKinley suffered a stroke in 1946. He died on January 3, 1950.

== Works ==
- The Intraneural Plexus of Fasciculi and Fibers in the Sciatic Nerve. Archives of Neurology and Psychiatry. October 1921. Vol. 6. pp. 377–399.

== See also ==
- Psychological testing
