= Personality Assessment Inventory =

Multiscale inventory of personality and psychopathology

Personality Assessment Inventory (PAI), developed by Leslie Morey (1991, 2007), is a self-report 344-item personality test that assesses a respondent's personality and psychopathology. Each item is a statement about the respondent that the respondent rates with a 4-point scale (1-"Not true at all, False", 2-"Slightly true", 3-"Mainly true", and 4-"Very true"). It is used in various contexts, including psychotherapy, crisis/evaluation, forensic, personnel selection, pain/medical, and child custody assessment. The test construction strategy for the PAI was primarily deductive and rational. It shows good convergent validity with other personality tests, such as the Minnesota Multiphasic Personality Inventory and the Revised NEO Personality Inventory.

== Scales ==
The PAI has 22 non-overlapping scales of four varieties: 1) validity scales, 2) clinical scales, 3) treatment consideration scales, and 4) interpersonal scales.

=== Validity scales ===
The validity scales measure the respondent's overall approach to the test, including faking good or bad, exaggeration, defensiveness, carelessness, or random responding.

- Inconsistency (ICN) is the degree to which respondents answer similar questions in different ways.
- Infrequency (INF) is the degree to which respondents rate extremely bizarre or unusual statements as true.
- Positive Impression (PIM) is the degree to which respondents describe themselves in a positive or overly positive light.
- Negative Impression (NIM) is the degree to which respondents describe themselves in a negative or overly negative light; though this scale may also indicate severe levels of distress.

There are also four supplementary validity scales:

- Defensiveness Index; to assist in identifying defensive responding.
- Cashel Discriminant Function; to assist in identifying falsified profiles with a positive bias.
- Malingering Index; to assist in identifying feigned mental illness.
- Rogers Discriminant Function; to assist in identifying simulated profiles with a negative bias.

Further identification of exaggeration and/or negative bias can be calculated used the NIM Predicted Profile

Additionally, one can also apply the use of the Negative Distortion Scale

=== Clinical scales ===
The clinical scales measure the respondent's psychopathology using diagnostic categories that were judged by the developers to be relevant based on their historical and contemporary popularity among psychologists. Each clinical scale (except Alcohol Problems and Drug Problems) represents a particular trait, and each scale has sub-scales that represent more specific aspects of that trait.

- Somatic concerns (SOM) measures a respondent's physical concerns and complaints.
- Anxiety (ANX) measures a respondent's general feelings of tension, worry, and nervousness.
- Anxiety Related Disorders (ARD) measures more specific anxiety symptoms that relate to different categories of anxiety disorders.
- Depression (DEP) measures a respondent's general feelings of worthlessness, sadness, and lethargy.
- Mania (MAN) measures a respondent's level of high energy and excitability.
- Paranoia (PAR) measures a respondent's suspiciousness and concern about others harming them.
- Schizophrenia (SCZ) measures a respondent's unusual sensory experiences, bizarre thoughts, and social detachment.
- Borderline features (BOR) measures a respondent's problems with identity, emotional instability, and problems with friendships.
- Antisocial features (ANT) measures a respondent's level of cruel/criminal behavior and selfishness.
- Alcohol Problems (ALC) measures a respondent's problems with excessive drinking.
- Drug Problems (DRG) measures a respondent's problems with excessive recreational drug use.

=== Treatment consideration scales ===
The treatment consideration scales measure factors that may relate to treatment of clinical disorders or other risk factors but which are not captured in psychiatric diagnoses.

- Aggression (AGG) measures the respondent's different kinds of aggressive behaviors toward others.
- Suicidal ideation (SUI) measures a respondent's frequency and severity of suicidal thoughts and plans.
- Nonsupport (NON) measures how socially isolated a respondent feels, and how little support the respondent reports having.
- Stress (STR) measures the controllable and uncontrollable hassles and stressors reported by the respondent.
- Treatment rejection (RXR) measures certain attributes of the respondent that are known to be related to psychological treatment adherence, including motivation, willingness to accept responsibility, and openness to change and new ideas.

=== Interpersonal scales ===
The interpersonal scales measure two factors that affect interpersonal functioning for the respondent. They are based on the circumplex model of emotion classification.

- Dominance (DOM) measures the degree to which a respondent acts dominant, assertive, and in control in social situations.
- Warmth (WRM) measures the degree to which a respondent acts kind, empathic, and engaging in social situations.

== Development ==
The rationale behind the development of the PAI was to create an assessment tool that would enable the measurement of psychological concepts while maintaining statistical strength. The development methodology was based on several advances that the field of personality assessment was witnessing at the time. Due to the fuzzy nature of constructs (concepts) in psychology, it is very difficult to use criterion-referenced approaches, such as those used in some parts of medicine (e.g. pregnancy tests). This is why construct validation is very important to personality test development. It is usually described as being involved when tests intend to measure some construct that is not "operationally defined". The PAI was developed because the authors of the instrument felt that there were a limited number of self-report questionnaires that were using this type of construct validation method to assess areas relevant to diagnoses and treatment planning.

The developers of the PAI examined various literary sources to come up with the five areas assessed by the PAI (validity of responses, clinical symptoms, interpersonal styles, complications for treatment, and characteristics of one's environment). Constructs were included if they had been relatively stable in their importance of diagnosing mental disorders over time, and if they were important in contemporary clinical practice. The construct validation approach that was used to construct the PAI was used to maximize two types of validity: content validity and discriminant validity. To ensure that the PAI maximized content validity, each scale had a balanced sample of items that represented a range of important items for each construct. For example, the Depression scale has items involving physical, emotional, and cognitive content (as opposed to only questions about mood or interests). Each scale also assesses a range of severity for that scale; for example, the Suicidal Ideation scale has items that range from vague ideas about suicide to distinct plans for self-harm. To ensure that the PAI maximized discriminant validity, each of the scales should be relatively distinct from one another. For example, if the depression and anxiety scales had many of the same items on them, it would be difficult to tell if elevations on these scales meant that the person was experiencing symptoms of depression, anxiety, or both. As such, the developers of the PAI stressed the fact that their measure has no overlapping items to ensure better interpretation of the scales.

The PAI focuses on the content of psychological concepts. The initial items were written so that the content would be directly relevant to the different constructs measured by the test. These items were rated for their quality, appropriateness, and bias. For example, a bias review panel identified items that could seem to be pathological but are actually normal within a subculture. After ensuring that the PAI addressed certain concepts in psychopathology, the developers proceeded to a second stage in the process. This stage involved the "empirical evaluation" of the items. The research team administered two versions of the test, first to a sample of college students and later to a normative sample. These versions were evaluated using several criteria, such as internal consistency of the scales (or how much the items in one scale correlate with each other). The ability to fake good or bad while taking the test was also evaluated using a sample of college students that were given different instructions on how to answer the test.

== See also ==
- 16PF Personality Questionnaire
- MBTI
- Minnesota Multiphasic Personality Inventory
- NEO-PI
