= Validity scale =

Scale in psychological testing

A validity scale, in psychological testing, is a scale used in an attempt to measure reliability of responses, for example with the goal of detecting defensiveness, malingering, or careless or random responding.

For example, the Minnesota Multiphasic Personality Inventory has validity scales to measure questions not answered; client "faking good"; client "faking bad" (in first half of test); denial/evasiveness; client "faking bad" (in last half of test); answering similar/opposite question pairs inconsistently; answering questions all true/all false; honesty of test responses/not faking good or bad; "appearing excessively good"; frequency of presentation in clinical setting; and overreporting of somatic symptoms. The Personality Assessment Inventory has validity scales to measure inconsistency (the degree to which respondents answer similar questions in the same way), infrequency (the degree to which respondents rate extremely bizarre or unusual statements as true), positive impression (the degree to which respondents describe themselves in a positive light), and negative impression (the degree to which respondents describe themselves in a negative light). The Psychological Inventory of Criminal Thinking has two validity scales (Confusion and Defensiveness). The Inwald Personality Inventory has one validity scale, the Guardedness Scale, measuring social desirability.

The usefulness of the currently-existing validity scales is sometimes questioned. One theory is that subjects in tests of validity scales are given instructions (e.g. to fake the best impression of themselves or to fake an emotionally disturbed person) that virtually guarantee the detection of faking. The tests may not be designed to detect role faking.

Some commonly used tests do not include validity scales, and are readily faked due to their high face validity.
