= Minnesota Multiphasic Personality Inventory =

Standardized psychometric measure of psychopathology and personality

- ICD-9-CM: 94.02
- MeSH: D008950

The Minnesota Multiphasic Personality Inventory (MMPI) is a standardized psychometric test of adult personality and psychopathology. A version for adolescents also exists, the MMPI-A, which was first published in 1992. Psychologists use various versions of the MMPI to help develop treatment plans, assist with differential diagnosis, help answer legal questions (forensic psychology), screen job candidates during the personnel selection process, or as part of a therapeutic assessment procedure.

The test consists of a set of first-person statements regarding mental health symptoms, beliefs, sensations, and attitudes that the subject is instructed to identify as true or false for themselves.

The original MMPI was developed by Starke R. Hathaway and J. C. McKinley, faculty of the University of Minnesota, and first published by the University of Minnesota Press in 1943. It was replaced by an updated version, the MMPI-2, in 1989 (Butcher, Dahlstrom, Graham, Tellegen, and Kaemmer). An alternative version of the test, the MMPI-2 Restructured Form (MMPI-2-RF), published in 2008, retains some aspects of the traditional MMPI assessment strategy, but adopts a different theoretical approach to personality test development. The newest version (MMPI-3) was released in 2020.

== History ==
The original authors of the MMPI were American psychologist Starke R. Hathaway and American neurologist J. C. McKinley. The MMPI is copyrighted by the University of Minnesota.

The MMPI was designed as an adult measure of psychopathology and personality structure in 1939. Many additions and changes to the measure have been made over time to improve interpretability of the original clinical scales. Additionally, there have been changes in the number of items in the measure, and other adjustments which reflect its current use as a tool towards modern psychopathy and personality disorders. The most historically significant developmental changes include:

- In 1989, the MMPI became the MMPI-2 as a result of a restandardization project to develop a new set of normative data representing current population characteristics; the restandardization increased the size of the normative database to include a wide range of clinical and non-clinical samples; psychometric characteristics of the clinical scales were not addressed at that time.
- In 2003, the Restructured Clinical scales were added to the published MMPI-2, representing a reconstruction of the original clinical scales designed to address known psychometric flaws in the original clinical scales that unnecessarily complicated their interpretability and validity, but could not be addressed at the same time as the restandardization process. Specifically, Demoralization – a non-specific distress component thought to impair the discriminant validity of many self-report measures of psychopathology – was identified and removed from the original clinical scales. Restructuring the clinical scales was the initial step toward addressing the remaining psychometric and theoretical problems of the MMPI-2.
- In 2008, the MMPI-2-RF (Restructured Form) was published to psychometrically and theoretically fine-tune the measure. The MMPI-2-RF contains 338 items, contains 9 validity and 42 homogeneous substantive scales, and allows for a straightforward interpretation strategy. The MMPI-2-RF was constructed using a similar rationale used to create the Restructured Clinical (RC) scales. The rest of the measure was developed utilizing statistical analysis techniques that produced the RC scales as well as a hierarchical set of scales similar to contemporary models of psychopathology to inform the overall measure reorganization. The entire measure reconstruction was accomplished using the original 567 items contained in the MMPI-2 item pool. The MMPI-2 Restandardization norms were used to validate the MMPI-2-RF; over 53,000 correlations based on more than 600 reference criteria are available in the MMPI-2-RF Technical Manual for the purpose of comparing the validity and reliability of MMPI-2-RF scales with those of the MMPI-2. Across multiple studies and as supported in the technical manual, the MMPI-2-RF performs as good as or, in many cases, better than the MMPI-2.

The MMPI-2-RF is a streamlined measure. Retaining only 338 of the original 567 items, its hierarchical scale structure provides non-redundant information across 51 scales that are easily interpretable. Validity scales were retained (revised), two new validity scales have been added (Fs in 2008 and RBS in 2011), and there are new scales that capture somatic complaints. All of the MMPI-2-RF's scales demonstrate either increased or equivalent construct and criterion validity compared to their MMPI-2 counterparts.

Current versions of the test (MMPI-2 and MMPI-2-RF) can be completed on optical scan forms or administered directly to individuals on the computer. The MMPI-2 can generate a Score Report or an Extended Score Report, which includes the Restructured Clinical scales from which the Restructured Form was later developed. The MMPI-2 Extended Score Report includes scores on the original clinical scales as well as Content, Supplementary, and other subscales of potential interest to clinicians. Additionally, the MMPI-2-RF computer scoring offers an option for the administrator to select a specific reference group with which to contrast and compare an individual's obtained scores; comparison groups include clinical, non-clinical, medical, forensic, and pre-employment settings, to name a few. The newest version of the Pearson Q-Local computer scoring program offers the option of converting MMPI-2 data into MMPI-2-RF reports as well as numerous other new features. Use of the MMPI is tightly controlled. Any clinician using the MMPI is required to meet specific test publisher requirements in terms of training and experience, must pay for all administration materials including the annual computer scoring license and is charged for each report generated by computer.

In 2018, the University of Minnesota Press commissioned development of the MMPI-3, which was to be based in part on the MMPI-2-RF and include updated normative data. It was published in December 2020.

=== MMPI ===
The original MMPI was developed on a scale-by-scale basis in the late 1930s and early 1940s. Hathaway and McKinley used an empirical [criterion] keying approach, with clinical scales derived by selecting items that were endorsed by patients known to have been diagnosed with certain pathologies. The difference between this approach and other test development strategies used around that time was that it was in many ways atheoretical (not based on any particular theory) and thus the initial test was not aligned with the prevailing psychodynamic theories. Theory in some ways affected the development process, if only because the candidate test items and patient groups on which scales were developed were affected by prevailing personality and psychopathological theories of the time. The approach to MMPI development ostensibly enabled the test to capture aspects of human psychopathology that were recognizable and meaningful, despite changes in clinical theories. However, the MMPI had flaws of validity that were soon apparent and could not be overlooked indefinitely. The control group for its original testing consisted of a small number of individuals, mostly young, white, and married men and women from rural areas of the Midwest. (The racial makeup of the respondents reflected the ethnic makeup of that time and place.) The MMPI also faced problems as to its terminology and its irrelevance to the population that the test was intended to measure. It became necessary for the MMPI to measure a more diverse number of potential mental health problems, such as "suicidal tendencies, drug abuse, and treatment-related behaviors."

=== MMPI-2 ===
The first major revision of the MMPI was the MMPI-2, which was standardized on a new national sample of adults in the United States and released in 1989. The new standardization was based on 2,600 individuals from a more representative background than the MMPI. It is appropriate for use with adults 18 and over. Subsequent revisions of certain test elements have been published, and a wide variety of sub scales were introduced over many years to help clinicians interpret the results of the original 10 clinical scales. The current MMPI-2 has 567 items, and usually takes between one and two hours to complete depending on reading level. It is designed to require a 4.6 grade (Flesh-Kincaid) reading level. There is an infrequently used abbreviated form of the test that consists of the MMPI-2's first 370 items. The shorter version has been mainly used in circumstances that have not allowed the full version to be completed (e.g., illness or time pressure), but the scores available on the shorter version are not as extensive as those available in the 567-item version. The original form of the MMPI-2 is the third most frequently utilized test in the field of psychology, behind the most used IQ and achievement tests.

=== MMPI-A ===
A version of the test designed for adolescents ages 14 to 18, the MMPI-A, was released in 1992. The youth version was developed to improve measurement of personality, behavior difficulties, and psychopathology among adolescents. It addressed limitations of using the original MMPI among adolescent populations. Twelve- to thirteen-year-old children were assessed and could not adequately understand the question content so the MMPI-A is not meant for children younger than 14. People who are 18 and no longer in high school may appropriately be tested with the MMPI-2.

Some concerns related to use of the MMPI with youth included inadequate item content, lack of appropriate norms, and problems with extreme reporting. For example, many items were written from an adult perspective, and did not cover content critical to adolescents (e.g., peers, school). Likewise, adolescent norms were not published until the 1970s, and there was not consensus on whether adult or adolescent norms should be used when the instrument was administered to youth. Finally, the use of adult norms tended to overpathologize adolescents, who demonstrated elevations on most original MMPI scales (e.g., T scores greater than 70 on the F validity scale; marked elevations on clinical scales 8 and 9). Therefore, an adolescent version was developed and tested during the restandardization process of the MMPI, which resulted in the MMPI-A.

The MMPI-A has 478 items. It includes the original 10 clinical scales (Hs, D, Hy, Pd, Mf, Pa, Pt, Sc, Ma, Si), six validity scales (?, L, F, F1, F2, K, VRIN, TRIN), 31 Harris Lingoes subscales, 15 content component scales (A-anx, A-obs, A-dep, A-hea, A-ain, A-biz, A-ang, A-cyn, A-con, A-lse, A-las, A-sod, A-fam, A-sch, A-trt), the Personality Psychopathology Five (PSY-5) scales (AGGR, PSYC, DISC, NEGE, INTR), three social introversion subscales (Shyness/Self-Consciousness, Social Avoidance, Alienation), and six supplementary scales (A, R, MAC-R, ACK, PRO, IMM). There is also a short form of 350 items, which covers the basic scales (validity and clinical scales). The validity, clinical, content, and supplementary scales of the MMPI-A have demonstrated adequate to strong test-retest reliability, internal consistency, and validity.

A four factor model (similar to all of the MMPI instruments) was chosen for the MMPI-A and included

1. General Maladjustment
2. Over-control (repression) (L, K, Ma)
3. Si (Social Introversion)
4. MF (Masculine/Feminine)

The MMPI-A normative and clinical samples included 805 males and 815 females, ages 14 to 18, recruited from eight schools across the United States and 420 males and 293 females ages 14 to 18 recruited from treatment facilities in Minneapolis and Minnesota, respectively. Norms were prepared by standardizing raw scores using a uniform t-score transformation, which was developed by Auke Tellegen and adopted for the MMPI-2. This technique preserves the positive skew of scores but also allows percentile comparison.

Strengths of the MMPI-A include the use of adolescent norms, appropriate and relevant item content, inclusion of a shortened version, a clear and comprehensive manual, and strong evidence of validity.

Critiques of the MMPI-A include a non-representative clinical norms sample, overlap in what the clinical scales measure, irrelevance of the mf scale, as well as long length and high reading level of the instrument.

The MMPI-A is one of the most commonly used instruments among adolescent populations.

A restructured form of the MMPI-A, the MMPI-A-RF was published in 2016.

=== MMPI-2-RF ===
The University of Minnesota Press published a new version of the MMPI-2, the MMPI-2 Restructured Form (MMPI-2-RF), in 2008. The MMPI-2-RF builds on the Restructured Clinical (RC) scales developed in 2003, and subsequently subjected to extensive research, with an overriding goal of improved discriminant validity, or the ability of the test to reliably differentiate between clinical syndromes or diagnoses. Most of the MMPI and MMPI-2 Clinical Scales are relatively heterogeneous, i.e., they measure diverse groupings of signs and symptoms, such that an elevation on Scale 2 (Depression), for example, may or may not indicate a depressive disorder. (Note: Although elevations on other Clinical Scales, Scale 2 subscales, Content Scales, or Supplementary Scales can help the clinician determine a more precise meaning of the Scale 2 elevation.) The MMPI-2-RF scales, on the other hand, are fairly homogeneous; are designed to more precisely measure distinct symptom constellations or disorders. From a theoretical perspective, the MMPI-2-RF scales rest on an assumption that psychopathology is a homogeneous condition that is additive.

Advances in psychometric theory, test development methods, and statistical analyses used to develop the MMPI-2-RF were not available when the MMPI was developed.

=== MMPI-3 ===
The MMPI-3 was released in December 2020. Its primary goals were to enhance the item pool, update the test norms, optimize existing scales, and introduce new scales (that assess disordered eating, compulsivity, impulsivity, and self-importance). It features a new, nationally representative normative sample, selected to match projections for race and ethnicity, education, and age. Spanish language norms are available for use with the U.S. Spanish translation of the MMPI-3.

== Scale composition ==
=== Clinical scales ===
The original clinical scales were designed to measure common diagnoses of the era.

Number	Abbreviation	Name	Description	No. of items
1	Hs	Hypochondriasis	Concern with bodily symptoms	32
2	D	Depression	Depressive symptoms	57
3	Hy	Hysteria	Awareness of problems and vulnerabilities	60
4	Pd	Psychopathic Deviate	Conflict, struggle, anger, respect for society's rules	50
5	MF	Masculinity/Femininity	Stereotypical masculine or feminine interests/behaviors	56
6	Pa	Paranoia	Level of trust, suspiciousness, sensitivity	40
7	Pt	Psychasthenia	Worry, anxiety, tension, doubts, obsessiveness	48
8	Sc	Schizophrenia	Odd thinking and social alienation	78
9	Ma	Hypomania	Level of excitability	46
0	Si	Social Introversion	People orientation	69

==== Code types ====
Code types are a combination of the two or three (and, according to a few authors, even four) highest-scoring clinical scales (e.g. 4, 8, 6 = 486). Code types are interpreted as a single, wider ranged elevation, rather than interpreting each scale individually. For profiles without defined code types, interpretation should focus on the individual scales.

==== Psychopathic Deviate ====
This scale comes from the Minnesota Multiphasic Personality Inventory-2 (MMPI-2), where 50 statements compose the Psychopathic Deviate subscale. The 50 statements must be answered in true or false format as applied to one's self.

The Psychopathic Deviate scale measures general social maladjustment and the absence of strongly pleasant experiences. The items on this scale tap into complaints about family and authority figures in general, self-alienation, social alienation and boredom.

When diagnosing psychopathy, the MMPI-2's Psychopathic Deviate scale is considered one of the traditional personality tests that contain subscales relating to psychopathy, though they assess relatively non-specific tendencies towards antisocial or criminal behavior.

==== Clinical subscales ====
The clinical scales are heterogeneous for their item content. To assist clinicians in interpreting the scales, researchers have developed subscales of more homogeneous items within each scale. The Harris–Lingoes (1955) scales was one of the most widely used results of this approach and were included in the MMPI-2 and MMPI-A.

=== Restructured Clinical (RC) scales ===
The Restructured Clinical scales were designed to be psychometrically improved versions of the original clinical scales, which were known to contain a high level of interscale correlation, overlapping items, and were confounded by the presence of an overarching factor that has since been extracted and placed in a separate scale (demoralization). The RC scales measure the core constructs of the original clinical scales. Critics of the RC scales assert they have deviated too far from the original clinical scales, the implication being that previous research done on the clinical scales will not be relevant to the interpretation of the RC scales. However, researchers on the RC scales assert that the RC scales predict pathology in their designated areas better than their concordant original clinical scales while using significantly fewer items and maintaining equal to higher internal consistency, reliability and validity; further, unlike the original clinical scales, the RC scales are not saturated with the primary factor (demoralization, now captured in RCdem) which frequently produced diffuse elevations and made interpretation of results difficult; finally, the RC scales have lower interscale correlations and, in contrast to the original clinical scales, contain no interscale item overlap. The effects of removal of the common variance spread across the older clinical scales due to a general factor common to psychopathology, through use of sophisticated psychometric methods, was described as a paradigm shift in personality assessment. Critics of the new scales argue that the removal of this common variance makes the RC scales less ecologically valid (less like real life) because real patients tend to present complex patterns of symptoms. Proponents of the MMPI-2-RF argue that this potential problem is addressed by being able to view elevations on other RC scales that are less saturated with the general factor and, therefore, are also more transparent and much easier to interpret.

Scale	Abbreviation	Name	Description
RCd	dem	Demoralization	A general measure of distress that is linked with anxiety, depression, helplessness, hopelessness, low self-esteem, and a sense of inefficacy
RC1	som	Somatic Complaints	Measures an individual's tendency to medically unexplainable physical symptoms
RC2	lpe	Low Positive Emotions	Measures features of anhedonia – a common feature of depression
RC3	cyn	Cynicism	Measures a negative or overly-critical worldview that is associated with an increased likelihood of impaired interpersonal relationships, hostility, anger, low trust, and workplace misconduct
RC4	asb	Antisocial Behavior	Measures the acting out and social deviance features of antisocial personality such as rule breaking, irresponsibility, failure to conform to social norms, deceit, and impulsivity that often manifests in aggression and substance abuse
RC6	per	Ideas of Persecution	Measures a tendency to develop paranoid delusions, persecutory beliefs, interpersonal suspiciousness and alienation, and mistrust
RC7	dne	Dysfunctional Negative Emotions	Measures a tendency to worry/be fearful, be anxious, feel victimized and resentful, and appraise situations generally in ways that foster negative emotions
RC8	abx	Aberrant Experiences	Measures risk for psychosis, unusual thinking and perception, and risk for non-persecutory symptoms of thought disorders
RC9	hpm	Hypomanic Activation	Measures features of mania such as aggression and excitability

=== Validity scales ===
The validity scales in all versions of the MMPI-2 (MMPI-2 and RF) contain three basic types of validity measures: those that were designed to detect non-responding or inconsistent responding (CNS, VRIN, TRIN), those designed to detect when clients are over reporting or exaggerating the prevalence or severity of psychological symptoms (F, F_{B}, F_{P}, FBS), and those designed to detect when test-takers are under-reporting or downplaying psychological symptoms (L, K, S). A new addition to the validity scales for the MMPI-2-RF includes an over reporting scale of somatic symptoms (F_{S}) as well as revised versions of the validity scales of the MMPI-2 (VRIN-r, TRIN-r, F-r, F_{P}-r, FBS-r, L-r, and K-r). The MMPI-2-RF does not include the S or F_{B} scales, and the F-r scale now covers the entirety of the test.

Abbreviation	New in version	Name	Description
CNS	1	"Cannot Say"	Questions not answered (left blank or both True and False)
L	1	"Lie" / Uncommon Virtues	Intentional under-reporting of symptoms
F	1	Infrequency	Over-reporting symptoms (in first half of test)
K	1	Defensiveness	Unintentional under-reporting of symptoms (e.g. defensiveness, denial)
F_{b}	2	F Back	Over-reporting symptoms (in last half of test)
VRIN	2	Variable Response Inconsistency	Answering similar/opposite question pairs inconsistently
TRIN	2	True Response Inconsistency	Answering questions all true/all false
F-K	2	F minus K	Honesty of test responses/not faking good or bad
S	2	Superlative Self-Presentation	Improving upon K scale, "appearing excessively good"
F_{p}	2	F-psychopathology	Over-reporting symptoms in individuals with psychopathology
FBS	2	"Faking Bad Scale" / Symptom Validity	Over-reporting somatic or cognitive symptoms in disability/personal injury claimants
RBS	2	Response Bias Scale	Exaggerated memory complaints in forensic settings or disability claims
F_{s}	2-RF	Infrequent Somatic Response	Overreporting of somatic symptoms
CRIN	3	Combined Response Inconsistency	Combination of random and fixed inconsistent responding

=== Content scales ===
Although elevations on the clinical scales are significant indicators of certain psychological conditions, it is difficult to determine exactly what specific behaviors the high scores are related to. The content scales of the MMPI-2 were developed for the purpose of increasing the incremental validity of the clinical scales. The content scales contain items intended to provide insight into specific types of symptoms and areas of functioning that the clinical scales do not measure, and are supposed to be used in addition to the clinical scales to interpret profiles. They were developed by Butcher, Graham, Williams and Ben-Porath using similar rational and statistical procedures as Wiggins who developed the original MMPI content scales.

The items on the content scales contain obvious content and therefore are susceptible to response bias – exaggeration or denial of symptoms, and should be interpreted with caution. T scores greater than 65 on any content scale are considered high scores.

Abbr.	Name	Description
ANX	Anxiety	General symptoms of anxiety, somatic problems, nervousness or worry
FRS	Fears	Specific fears and general fearfulness
OBS	Obsessiveness	Difficulty making decisions, excessive rumination and dislike change
DEP	Depression	Feelings of low mood, lack of energy, suicidal ideation and other depressive features
HEA	Health Concerns	Concerns about illness and physical symptoms
BIZ	Bizarre Mentation	The presence of psychotic thought processes
ANG	Anger	Feelings and expression of anger
CYN	Cynicism	Distrust and suspiciousness of other people and their motives
ASP	Antisocial Practices	Expression of nonconforming attitudes and possible issues with authority
TPA	Type A Behavior	Irritability, impatience and competitiveness
LSE	Low Self Esteem	Negative attitudes about self, own ability and submissiveness
SOD	Social Discomfort	Preferring to be alone and discomfort when meeting new people
FAM	Family Problems	Resentment, anger and perceived lack of support from family members
WRK	Work Interference	Attitudes that contribute to poor work performance
TRT	Negative Treatment Indicators	Feelings of pessimism and unwillingness to reveal personal information to others

==== Content component scales ====
The MMPI-2 and MMPI-A included subscales for some of the content scales to further specify the results. For example, Depression (DEP) was broken down into Lack of drive (DEP_{1}), Dysphoria (DEP_{2}), Self-depreciation (DEP_{3}) and Suicidal ideation (DEP_{4}).

=== Supplemental scales ===
To supplement these multidimensional scales and to assist in interpreting the frequently seen diffuse elevations due to the general factor (removed in the RC scales), the supplemental scales were also developed, with the more frequently used being the substance abuse scales (MAC-R, APS, AAS), designed to assess the extent to which a client admits to or is prone to abusing substances, and the A (anxiety) and R (repression) scales, developed by Welsh after conducting a factor analysis of the original MMPI item pool.

Abbr.	Name	Description
Broad personality characteristics
A	Anxiety	General maladjustment; symptoms of anxiety, depression, somatic complaints
R	Repression	Internalizing, introverted, careful and cautious lifestyle
Es	Ego Strength	General adjustment, resources for coping; better treatment prognosis
Do	Dominance	Perception of strength in self and others; self-confident; not readily intimidated
Re	Social Responsibility	Accepts consequences of behavior; responsibility to social group; dependable and trustworthy
Generalized emotional distress
Mt	College Maladjustment	Ineffective, anxious, pessimistic; developed for (but not specific to) college students
PK	Post-Traumatic Stress Disorder - Keane	Intense emotional distress, anxiety, sleep disturbance; developed for (but not specific to) veterans
MDS	Marital Distress	Dyssatisfaction with marriage or romantic relationship
Behavioral dyscontrol
Ho	Hostility	General maladjustment; angry, hostile, cynical, suspicious; increased risk of health problems
O-H	Over-controlled Hostility	Occasionally hostile, angry; intensity follows the amount of provocation
MAC-R	MacAndrew (Note: MacAndrew Addiction Scale; MacAndrew C (1965). "The differentiation of male alcoholic outpatients from non-alcoholic psychiatric outpatients by means of the MMPI". Quarterly Journal of Studies on Alcohol. 26 (2): 238–246. doi:10.15288/qjsa.1965.26.238. PMID 14320345.)-Revised	Risk-taking, sensation-seeking; extroverted, exhibitionistic; risk of substance abuse; limited use for women
AAS	Addiction Admission	Acknowledges substance abuse, history of acting out
APS	Addiction Potential	Possible substance abuse problems, possible anti-social behavior
Gender role
GM	Gender Role - Masculine	Stereotypical masculine interests and activities; denial of fears and anxieties; self-confidence
GF	Gender Role - Feminine	Stereotypical feminine interests and activities; denial of antisocial behavior; excessively sensitive

=== PSY-5 (Personality Psychopathology Five) scales ===
The PSY-5 is set of scales measuring dimensional traits of personality disorders, originally developed from factor analysis of the personality disorder content of the Diagnostic and Statistical Manual of Mental Disorders. Originally, these scales were titled: Aggressiveness, Psychoticism, Constraint, Negative Emotionality/Neuroticism, and Positive Emotionality/Extraversion; however, in the most current edition of the MMPI-2 and MMPI-2-RF, the Constraint and Positive Emotionality scales have been reversed and renamed as Disconstraint and Introversion / Low Positive Emotionality.

Across several large samples including clinical, college, and normative populations, the MMPI-2 PSY-5 scales showed moderate internal consistency and intercorrelations comparable with the domain scales on the NEO-PI-R Big Five personality measure. Also, scores on the MMPI-2 PSY-5 scales appear to be similar across genders, and the structure of the PSY-5 has been reproduced in a Dutch psychiatric sample.

Abbr.	Scale Name	Description
AGGR	Aggressiveness	Measures an individual's tendency towards overt and instrumental aggression that typically includes a sense of grandiosity and a desire for power
PSYC	Psychoticism	Measures the accuracy of an individual's inner representation of objective reality, often associated with perceptual aberration and magical ideation
DISC	Disconstraint	Measures an individual's level of control over their own impulses, physical risk aversion, and traditionalism
NEGE	Negative Emotionality / Neuroticism	Measures an individual's tendency to experience negative emotions, particularly anxiety and worry
INTR	Introversion/Low Positive Emotionality	Measures an individual's tendency to experience positive emotions and have enjoyment from social experiences

=== MMPI-A-RF ===
The Minnesota Multiphasic Personality Inventory – Adolescent – Restructured Form (MMPI-A-RF) is a broad-band instrument used to psychologically evaluate adolescents. It was published in 2016 and was primarily authored by Robert P. Archer, Richard W. Handel, Yossef S. Ben-Porath, and Auke Tellegen. It is a revised version of the Minnesota Multiphasic Personality Inventory – Adolescent (MMPI-A). Like the MMPI-A, this version is intended for use with adolescents aged 14–18 years old. It consists of 241 true-false items which produce scores on 48 scales: 6 Validity scales (VRIN-r, TRIN-r, CRIN, F-r, L-r, K-r), 3 Higher-Order scales (EID, THD, BXD), 9 Restructured Clinical scales (RCd, RC1, RC2, RC3, RC4, RC6, RC7, RC8, RC9), 25 Specific Problem scales, and revised versions of the MMPI-A PSY-5 scales (AGGR-r, PSYC-r, DISC-r, NEGE-r, INTR-r). It also features 14 critical items, including 7 regarding depressing and suicidal ideation.

The MMPI-A-RF was designed to address limitations of its predecessor, such as the scale heterogeneity and item overlap of the original clinical scales. The weaknesses of the clinical scales resulted in intercorrelations of several MMPI-A scales and limited discriminant validity of the scales. To address the issues with the clinical scales, the MMPI-A underwent a revision similar to the restructuring of the MMPI-2 to the MMPI-2-RF. Specifically, a demoralization scale was developed, and each clinical scale underwent exploratory factor analysis to identify its distinctive components.

Additionally, the Specific Problems (SP) scales were developed. Whereas the RC scales provide a broad overview of psychological problems (e.g., low positive emotions or symptoms of depression; antisocial behavior; bizarre thoughts), the SP scales offered narrow, focused descriptions of the problems the individual reported he or she was experiencing. The MMPI-2-RF SP Scales were used as a template. First, corresponding items from the MMPI-2-RF were identified in the MMPI-A, and then 58 items unique to the MMPI-A were added to the item pool. This way, the MMPI-A-RF SP scales could maintain continuity with the MMPI-2-RF but in addition address issues specific to adolescent problems. After a preliminary set of SP scales were developed based on their content, each scale went through statistical tests (factor analysis) to ensure they did not overlap or relate too strongly to the RC demoralization scale. Additional statistical analyses were put in place to make sure each SP scale contained items that were strongly related (correlated) with its scale and less strongly associated with other scales; in the end, each item appeared on only one SP scale. These scales were developed to provide additional information in association with the RC scales, but SP scales are not subscales and can be interpreted even when the related RC scale is not elevated.

As noted above, 25 SP scales were developed. Of these, 19 have the same names as the corresponding MMPI-2-RF SP scales, although the specific items that construct SP scales vary per form. The following 5 scales were unique to the MMPI-A-RF: Obsessions/Compulsions (OCS), Antisocial Attitudes (ASA), Conduct Problems (CNP), Negative Peer Influence (NPI), and Specific Fears (SPF).

The SP scales were organized into four groupings: Somatic/Cognitive, Internalizing, Externalizing, and Interpersonal Scales. The Somatic/Cognitive scales (MLS, GIC, HPC, NUC, and COG) share their names with the SP scales on the MMPI-2-RF, are related to RC1, and focus on aspects of physical health and functioning. There are nine Internalizing scales. The first three (HLP, SFD, and NFC) are related to aspects of demoralization, or the general sense of unhappiness, and the remaining scales (OCS, STW, AXY, ANP, BRF, SPF) assess for Dysfunctional Negative Emotions (e.g., a tendency toward worry, fearfulness, and anxiety). Six Externalizing scales (NSA, ASA, CNP, SUB, NPI, and AGG) are related to antisocial behavior, and the need for excitement and stimulating activity (i.e., hypomanic activation). Finally, Interpersonal scales (FML, IPP, SAV, SHY, and DSF), while not related to particular RC scales, focus on aspects of social and relational functioning with family and peers.

Additionally, the 478-item length of the MMPI-A was identified as a challenge to adolescent attention span and concentration. To address this, the MMPI-A-RF has less than half the items of the MMPI-A.

=== Higher-Order scales ===
Higher-Order (H-O) Scales were introduced with the MMPI-2-RF and they are identical in the MMPI-A-RF and the MMPI-3. Their function is to assess problems of three general areas of functioning: affective, cognitive (thought) and behavioral.

Abbr.	Name	Description
EID	Emotional / Internalizing Dysfunction	Problems associated with mood and affect
THD	Thought Dysfunction	Problems associated with disordered thinking
BXD	Behavioral / Externalizing Dysfunction	Problems associated with under-controlled behavior

=== Specific Problems (SP) scales ===
Abbr.	Name	Description	A-RF	2-RF	3
Somatic / Cognitive
MLS	Malaise	General sense of poor physical health, weakness, and low energy	Yes	Yes	Yes
GIC	Gastrointestinal Complaints	Complaints related to nausea, upset stomach, and vomiting	Yes	Yes	No
HPC	Head Pain Complaints	Reports of headaches and difficulty concentrating	Yes	Yes	No
NUC	Neurological Complaints	Describes loss of sensation, numbness, and lack of control over movement of body parts; dizziness	Yes	Yes	Yes
EAT	Eating concerns	Problematic eating behaviors	No	No	Yes
COG	Cognitive Complaints	Trouble with attention and concentrating; academic and learning difficulties	Yes	Yes	Yes
Internalizing
SUI	Suicidal/Death Ideation	Direct reports of suicidal ideation and recent attempts	No	Yes	Yes
HLP	Helplessness/Hopelessness	General sense of pessimism and low self-esteem in handling life's difficulties	Yes	Yes	Yes
SFD	Self-Doubt	Reports feeling useless, little self-confidence and highly critical view of self	Yes	Yes	Yes
NFC	Inefficacy	Reports seeing self as incapable and useless	Yes	Yes	Yes
OCS	Obsessions/Compulsions	Ruminates over unpleasant thoughts; engages in compulsive behaviors (e.g., repetitive counting)	Yes	No	No
STW	Stress/Worry	Experiences symptoms related to stress (e.g., trouble sleeping, problems concentrating, nervousness)	Yes	Yes	No
STR	Stress	Problems involving stress and nervousness	No	No	Yes
WRY	Worry	Excessive worry and preoccupation	No	No	Yes
CMP	Compulsivity	Engaging in compulsive behaviors	No	No	Yes
AXY	Anxiety	Reports experiences of dread, apprehension, and nightmares	Yes	Yes	No
ARX	Anxiety-Related Experiences	Multiple anxiety-related experiences such as catastrophizing, panic, dread, and intrusive ideation	No	No	Yes
ANP	Anger Proneness	Reports tendency to feel and express anger, aggression, and irritable behaviors	Yes	Yes	Yes
BRF	Behavior-Restricting Fears	Describes fears and anxiety that get in the way of daily functioning; general fearfulness and anxiety	Yes	Yes	Yes
SPF	Specific Fears	Reports fears and phobias (e.g., fear of blood, spiders, heights, etc.)	Yes	No	No
MSF	Multiple Specific Fears	Fears of blood, fire, thunder, etc.	No	Yes	No
Externalizing
NSA	Negative School Attitudes	Expresses dislike for school and difficulty being motivated in academic activities	Yes	No	No
ASA	Antisocial Attitudes	Reports breaking rules, school problems and suspension, and engaging in oppositional behaviors	Yes	No	No
CNP	Conduct Problems	Reports engaging in problematic behaviors at home and at school (e.g., problems with the law, running away from home, school suspensions)	Yes	No	No
JCP	Juvenile Conduct Problems	Difficulties at school and at home, stealing	No	Yes	Yes
SUB	Substance Abuse	Endorses behaviors related to problematic drug and alcohol use and abuse	Yes	Yes	Yes
NPI	Negative Peer Influence	Describes associating with peers who engage in problem behaviors (e.g., substance use, rule-breaking)	Yes	No	No
IMP	Impulsivity	Poor impulse control and nonplanful behavior	No	No	Yes
ACT	Activation	Heightened excitation and energy level	No	Yes	Yes
AGG	Aggression	Reports expressing anger physically and violently; threatening others verbally	Yes	Yes	Yes
CYN	Cynicism	Non-self-referential beliefs that others are bad and not to be trusted	No	No	Yes
Interpersonal
FML	Family Problems	Reports problematic family interactions and feeling unsupported; expresses a desire to leave home because of difficulties with family	Yes	Yes	Yes
IPP	Interpersonal Passivity	Expresses feeling unable to stand up for oneself; feels easy pushed around by others	Yes	Yes	No
SFI	Self-Importance	Beliefs related to having special talents and abilities	No	No	Yes
DOM	Dominance	Being domineering in relationships with others	No	No	Yes
SAV	Social Avoidance	Expresses discomfort being with others; withdrawn from interactions; reports having few friends	Yes	Yes	Yes
SHY	Shyness	Reports being easily embarrassed; feels nervous interacting with others	Yes	Yes	Yes
DSF	Disaffiliativeness	Expresses a preference for being alone and avoidance of interacting with others; withdrawn and reports having few friends	Yes	Yes	Yes

=== Interest Scales ===
The MMPI-2-RF includes two Interest Scales. The Aesthetic-Literary Interests (AES) scale rates interest in literature, music, theatre, and the likewise, and the Mechanical-Physical Interests (MEC) scale measures interest in construction and repair, and general interest in the outdoors and sports.

== Criticism ==
Like many standardized tests, scores on the various scales of the MMPI-2 and the MMPI-2-RF are not representative of either percentile rank or how "well" or "poorly" someone has done on the test. Rather, analysis looks at relative elevation of factors compared to the various norm groups studied. Raw scores on the scales are transformed into a standardized metric known as T-scores (mean equals 50, standard deviation equals 10), making interpretation easier for clinicians. Test manufacturers and publishers ask test purchasers to prove they are qualified to purchase the MMPI/MMPI-2/MMPI-2-RF and other tests.

=== Addition of the Lees-Haley FBS (Symptom Validity) ===
Psychologist Paul Lees-Haley developed the FBS (Fake Bad Scale). Although the FBS acronym remains in use, the official name for the scale changed to Symptom Validity Scale when it was incorporated into the standard scoring reports produced by Pearson, the licensed publisher. Some psychologists question the validity and utility of the FBS scale. The peer-reviewed journal Psychological Injury and Law published a series of pro and con articles in 2008, 2009, and 2010. Investigations of the factor structure of the Symptom Validity Scale (FBS and FBS-r) raise doubts about the scale's construct and predictive validity in the detection of malingering.

=== Racial disparity ===
One of the biggest criticisms of the original MMPI has been the discrepancy between white and non-white test-takers.

In the 1970s, Charles McCreary and Eligio Padilla from UCLA compared scores of black, white and Mexican-American men and found that non-whites tended to score five points higher on the test. They stated: "There is continuing controversy about the appropriateness of the MMPI when decisions involve persons from non-white racial and ethnic backgrounds. In general, studies of such divergent populations as prison inmates, medical patients, psychiatric patients, and high school and college students have found that blacks usually score higher than whites on the L, F, Sc, and Ma scales. There is near agreement that the notion of more psychopathology in racial ethnic minority groups is simplistic and untenable. Nevertheless, three divergent explanations of racial differences on the MMPI have been suggested. Black-white MMPI differences reflect variations in values, conceptions, and expectations that result from growing up in different cultures. Another point of view maintains that differences on the MMPI between blacks and whites are not a reflection of racial differences, but rather a reflection of overriding socioeconomic variations between racial groups. Thirdly, MMPI scales may reflect socioeconomic factors, while other scales are primarily race-related."

== Translations ==
Various versions of the MMPI have been translated into 27 languages and dialects.

Available translations (September 2026)
Language	MMPI-2	MMPI-2-RF	MMPI-A	MMPI-A-RF	MMPI-3
Bulgarian	Yes	—N/a	Yes	—N/a	—N/a
Chinese	Yes	—N/a	—N/a	—N/a	Pending
Croatian	Yes	Yes	Yes	—N/a	—N/a
Czech	Yes	—N/a	—N/a	—N/a	—N/a
Danish	Yes	Yes	—N/a	—N/a	Pending
Dutch / Flemish	Yes	Yes	Yes	—N/a	Yes
French (Canada)	Yes	Yes	—N/a	—N/a	Yes
French (France)	—N/a	Yes	Yes	—N/a	Pending
German	Yes	Yes	—N/a	—N/a	Pending
Greek	Yes	—N/a	—N/a	—N/a	Yes
Hebrew	Yes	Yes	—N/a	—N/a	Pending
Hmong	Yes	—N/a	—N/a	—N/a	—N/a
Hungarian	Yes	—N/a	Yes	—N/a	—N/a
Italian	Yes	Yes	Yes	—N/a	Yes
Japanese	—N/a	—N/a	—N/a	—N/a	Yes
Korean	Yes	Yes	Yes	Yes	Pending
Norwegian	Yes	Yes	—N/a	—N/a	Pending
Polish	Yes	—N/a	—N/a	—N/a	—N/a
Portuguese	—N/a	Yes	—N/a	—N/a	—N/a
Romanian	Yes	—N/a	—N/a	—N/a	—N/a
Russian	Yes	—N/a	—N/a	—N/a	—N/a
Slovak	Yes	—N/a	—N/a	—N/a	—N/a
Spanish (Mexico, Central America)	Yes	Yes	Yes	—N/a	Pending
Spanish (Spain, South & Central America)	Yes	Yes	Yes	Yes	Pending
Spanish (United States)	Yes	Yes	Yes	Yes	Yes
Swedish	Yes	Yes	—N/a	—N/a	Pending
Ukrainian	Yes	—N/a	—N/a	—N/a	—N/a

=== MMPI-2 in Chinese ===
The Chinese MMPI-2 was developed by Fanny M. Cheung, Weizhen Song, and Jianxin Zhang for Hong Kong and adapted for use in the mainland. The Chinese MMPI was used as a base instrument from which some items, that were the same in the MMPI-2, were retained. New items on the Chinese MMPI-2 underwent translation from English to Chinese and then back translation from Chinese to English to establish uniformity of the items and their content. The psychometrics are robust with the Chinese MMPI-2 having high reliability (a measure of whether the results of the scale are consistent). Reliability coefficients were found to be over 0.8 for the test in Hong Kong and were between 0.58 and 0.91 across scales for the mainland. In addition, the correlation of the Chinese MMPI-2 and the English MMPI-2 was found to average 0.64 for the clinical scales and 0.68 for the content scales indicating that the Chinese MMPI-2 is an effective tool of personality assessment.

=== MMPI-2 in Korean ===
The Korean MMPI-2 was initially translated by Kyunghee Han through a process of multiple rounds of translation (English to Korean) and back-translation (Korean to English), and it was tested in a sample of 726 Korean college students. In general, the test-retest reliabilities in the Korean sample were comparable to those in the American sample. For both culture samples, the median test-retest reliabilities were found to be higher for females than for males: 0.75 for Korean males and 0.78 for American males, whereas it was 0.85 for Korean females and 0.81 for American females. After retranslating and revising the items with minor translation accuracy problems, the final version of the Korean MMPI-2 was published in 2005. The published Korean MMPI-2 was standardized using a Korean adult normative sample, whose demographics were similar to the 2000 Korean Census data. Compared to the U. S. norm, scale means of Korean norm were significantly elevated; however, the reliabilities and validity of the Korean MMPI-2 were still found to be comparable with the English MMPI-2. The Korean MMPI-2 was further validated by using a Korean psychiatric sample from inpatient and outpatient facilities of Samsung National Hospital in Seoul. The internal consistency of the MMPI-2 scales for the psychiatric sample was comparable to the results obtained from the normative samples. Robust validity of the Korean MMPI-2 scales was evidenced by correlations with the SCL-90-R scales, behavioral correlates, and therapist ratings. The Korean MMPI-2 RF was published in 2011 and it was standardized using the Korean MMPI-2 normative sample with minor modifications.

=== MMPI-2 in Hmong ===
The MMPI-2 was translated into the Hmong language by Deinard, Butcher, Thao, Vang and Hang. The items for the Hmong-language MMPI-2 were obtained by translation and back-translation from the English version. After linguistic evaluation to ensure that the Hmong-language MMPI-2 was equivalent to the English MMPI-2, studies to assess whether the scales meant and measured the same concepts across the different languages. It was found that the findings from both the Hmong-language and English MMPI-2 were equivalent, indicating that the results obtained for a person tested with either version were very similar.

== See also ==
- 16PF Questionnaire
- Diagnostic classification and rating scales used in psychiatry
- Employment testing
- Neuroticism Extraversion Openness Personality Inventory (NEO-PI)
- Therapeutic assessment
