= Validity =

Validity or Valid may refer to:

== Mathematics ==
- Validity (logic), a property of a logical argument

== Statistics ==
- Validity (statistics), the degree to which a statistical tool measures that which it is purported to measure
  - Statistical conclusion validity, establishes the existence and strength of the co-variation between the cause and effect variables
  - Test validity, validity in educational and psychological testing
  - Face validity, the property of a test intended to measure something
  - Construct validity, refers to whether a scale measures or correlates with the theorized psychological construct it measures
  - Content validity, the extent to which a measure represents all facets of a given construct
  - Concurrent validity, the extent to which a test correlates with another measure
  - Predictive validity, the extent to which a score on a scale or test predicts scores on some other measure
  - Discriminant validity, the degree to which results a test of one concept can be expected to differ from tests of other concepts that should not be correlated with this one
  - Criterion validity, the extent to which a measure is related to an outcome
  - Convergent validity, the degree to which multiple measures of the same construct lead to the same conclusion

== Science ==
- Internal validity, the validity of causal inferences within scientific studies, usually based on experiments
- External validity, the validity of generalized causal inferences in scientific studies, usually based on experiments
- Valid name (zoology), in animal taxonomy
- Validly published name, in plant taxonomy

== Other uses ==
- Valid (number format), a universal number format (unum type III)
- Valid (engraving company), a Brazilian company
- VALID (Video Audio Line-up & IDentification), part of the GLITS broadcast television protocol
- Validity and liceity (Catholic Church), concepts in the Catholic Church.

== See also ==
- Validation (disambiguation)
