= Connectedness to nature scale =

The connectedness to nature scale (CNS) is a measure of individuals' trait levels of feeling emotionally connected to the natural world in the realm of social and environmental psychology. The CNS was “designed to tap an individual’s affective, experiential connection to nature.” The concept of connectedness to nature signifies the relationship between an individual and the environment. In brief, the scale intends to measure the level to which an individual feels connected with the natural world. Mayer and Frantz describe the CNS as a reliable, single-factored, multi-item scale that is easy to administer.

== Theory and development ==
Environment sustainability includes concerns about the growth of the world's population and the earth's natural resources that may run out sooner than humanity is prepared for that to happen. Because environmental sustainability deals mostly with humans and the choices we make, psychologists can help in understanding the relationship between humans and their environment, as well as help devise changes that people would be willing to implement into their daily lives. According to Mayer and Frantz, ecologists argue that feeling connected to nature and caring about nature is a fundamental key in having people adopt positive environmental and ecological behaviors. They believe people must care about something if they want to help save it! According to Restall and Conrad, understanding how people form a relationship with nature and how this relationship impacts a person's attitudes and behaviors towards the environment can help in formulating changes that, again, people will be willing to follow. This is exactly what the CNS intends to measure. In order to have people agree with changes made, the changes must align with what people believe, and the CNS aims to get at what people are feeling and believing about the environment.

== Reliability and validity ==
Mayer and Frantz conducted five studies when they introduced the CNS. All five studies showed “strong evidence that the CNS is a reliable and valid scale.” The goals of Study 1 were to test if the items on the scale have internal consistency and to establish convergent and incremental validity. The original internal consistency was alpha=.72, but after dropping three items that had negative inter-item correlations, the internal consistency raised to alpha=.84. When controlling for a similar scale, the NEP, the CNS and lifestyle measures still had significant correlations, speaking to the validity of the CNS.

Study 2 looked at whether the CNS is in fact associated with ecological behaviors. The researchers report that this study provided strong evidence that the CNS is related to ecological behavior. The researchers also looked for divergent validity in Study 2, and the results showed that the CNS does not correlate with academic tests, such as the SAT, showing its divergent validity.

The goals of Study 3 were to test if the CNS could predict real life decisions and to further establish the validity. The researchers hypothesized that students studying environmental studies would score higher than psychology, math, or chemistry students since the former are already showing motivation to study the environment. The authors report in their discussion of the results that the CNS does in fact capture a personality trait that is relevant in real life decisions. A factor analysis was done in Study 3 and it differed from Studies 1 and 2, suggesting an inconsistency in factor structure.

The goals of Study 4 were to investigate how the CNS explains the motivations behind positive ecological behavior and to compare the CNS to more current work on the subject of well-being. The researchers also hypothesized that the CNS would correlate with life satisfaction and also with biospheric values. They were trying to provide more predictive validity for the CNS. Results showed that the CNS did correlate with a measure of life satisfaction as well as a measure of biospheric value orientation.

In Study 5, their hypothesis was that there would only be moderate correlations between the CNS, INS, and IAT—the latter two scales both being other measures of one's connection to nature—showing incremental validity for the CNS. Results showed only a single factor as in Studies 1 and 2. The CNS correlated moderately with the INS (r= .55, p= <.001), so no real incremental validity was shown here. The CNS correlated marginally with the IAT (r= .27, p= .07), so incremental validity was shown here. Beery also confirmed the scale's high internal validity (α=0.84) and its high test-retest reliability (r=0.79).

According to Mayer and Frantz, the CNS can be utilized for a multitude of purposes: to monitor the extent to which activists are succeeding in endorsing essential changes, to evaluate whether interventions intended to increase peoples’ contact with nature actually do increase their sense of connection with nature, and even for “assessing the impact of architectural factors, such as windows looking out onto natural settings, on connection to nature.”

In 2011, Cervinka, Roderer, and Hefler conducted three studies in which they were looking at the relationships and correlations between psychological well-being and connectedness to nature. The results of these studies showed that there was a very low correlation between connectedness to nature and subjective well-being, meaning that the results from the Mayer and Frantz study in 2004 could not be replicated. According to Cervinka et al., the CNS only correlated with meaningfulness, suggesting that it measures something along the lines of one's experience with sense of meaning and purpose in life through nature.

== Controversies ==
There are some controversies surrounding the CNS. According to Perrin and Benassi, “after reanalyzing data from [Mayer and Frantz’s] article, collecting and analyzing our own data, and conducting a content analysis of CNS scale items, we conclude that the CNS does not measure an emotional connection to nature.” Perrin and Benassi provided a number of reasons for why they concluded the CNS does not measure emotions towards nature. For example, Mayer and Frantz use the word feel in eight out of the fourteen items on the CNS. Perrin and Benassi argue that the word feel, as it is used in the items of the CNS (“I feel that all inhabitants of the Earth, human and nonhuman, share a common life force”), does not mean an emotional state but a “cognitive assessment,”. Based on the definition of the word feel as cognition, Mayer and Frantz were correct in using this word in the measurement of a person's beliefs; however, they cannot accurately call the scale an affect-measuring one since the use of feel does not suggest an emotion. Nearly half of the items on the CNS involve no emotional content, while the rest contain that word feel, which in this context, really refers to cognition rather than an emotional state of being, according to Perrin and Benassi. Using data from their own studies, Perrin and Benassi “suggest that the CNS may be measuring a cognitive identity dimension of one’s relationship with nature,”. Perrin and Benassi suggest that the items of the CNS should be revised to clearly ask about a person's beliefs, not to be confused with a person's emotions, and that a new scale should be devised to measure one's emotions and the relation to the environment since the CNS does not.

Zhang, Howell, and Iyer designed a study to test the hypothesis that connectedness to nature is related to psychological well-being, as proposed by Mayer and Frantz. The researchers used the Engagement with Natural Beauty Scale to test this hypothesis and to measure participants’ tendencies to be stimulated by nature's beauty. Zhang and colleagues found that the positive relationship between connected with nature and psychological well-being was only significant for participants who regularly engage with nature's beauty. This suggests that the CNS may not be a significant predictor of psychological well-being, unless the participant engages with nature. People who are more emotionally involved/attuned to nature and its beauty are the people who gain the most benefits from being connected with nature, and the controversy is that the CNS will pick up on these people, but may not pick up on those who are not connected with nature.

== Measuring connectedness to nature in young children ==
The urgency to measure Connectedness to Nature (CN) construct early in life is obvious, but no simple tools are available to do so at this young age. Many try but fail to measure the modules of relevant interventions, namely Connectedness to Nature, facing a problem evaluating early environmental educations programmes targeting younger children.

A new 16-item parent questionnaire (CNI-PPC) to measure “connectedness to nature’ in very young children has been recently developed by Sobko and Brown. The original CN Index was modified and tested among Parents of Preschool Children (CNI-PPC) in an urban setting (Hong Kong) for its internal consistency and external validity. Confirmatory factor analysis revealed that the 16-item scale adequately captures four major dimensions: enjoyment of nature, empathy for nature, sense of responsibility, awareness of nature. The new questionnaire was tested against the Strengths and Difficulties Questionnaire, a well-established measurement of psychological well-being and children's behaviour problems. The results revealed that the children who had a closer connection with nature had less distress, less hyperactivity, & fewer behavioural and emotional difficulties, and improved pro-social behaviour. Interestingly, children who took greater responsibility towards the nature had fewer peer difficulties. The results give a new possibility for investigating the link between the outdoor environment and well-being in pre-school children. Thus, CNI-PPC factors have meaningful and substantive associations with the strengths and difficulties parents perceived in their children. This indicates the CNI-PPC is a valid and reliable instrument to measure CN at an age when children cannot respond themselves. Further, this simple tool could help researchers/practitioners to better understand how the connectedness to nature affect child psychological functioning and wellbeing.
