= CFC =

CFC, cfc, or Cfc may stand for:

== Places ==
The Casablanca Finance City, a financial hub in Morocco

== Science and technology ==
- Chlorofluorocarbon, a class of chemical compounds
- Cardiofaciocutaneous syndrome, a rare and serious genetic disorder
- Subpolar oceanic climate (Cfc in the Köppen climate classification), short, generally cool summers and long, mild winters with abundant precipitation year-round
- ColdFusion Components, objects or files used in ColdFusion application servers
- Carbon fibre composite, a composite carbon based material, used in fusion armour applications
- Consideration of future consequences, a personality trait
- Continuous function chart, sort of Function block diagram enabling to program both Boolean and analogue expressions; Often associated with Sequential function chart (SFC)
- Counterflow chiller, a type of heat exchanger.

== Education ==
- Canadian Film Centre, an institution for advanced training in film, television and new media in Canada
- Central Florida Community College, a public state college in Ocala, Florida

== Businesses and organizations ==
- Certificación Fonográfica Centroamericana, music certification organization
- California Fried Chicken, an Indonesia fast food chain
- CfC Stanbic Holdings, now Stanbic Holdings plc, a financial institution based in Kenya
- Computer Film Company, a London digital film special effects company
- Chess Federation of Canada, Canada's national chess organization
- Citizens for Conservation
- Compass Family Center, San Francisco family shelter
- Countrywide Financial Corporation, American residential mortgage banking and related businesses
- Consumer Federation of California, a California-based, nonprofit consumer advocacy organization.
- Common Fund for Commodities, an intergovernmental financial institution for supporting strongly commodity-dependent developing countries
- Consumer Federation of California, a consumer advocacy organization
- Centers for Change, precursor in New York of the International Workers Party
- Chemins de fer de Corse, the railway system in Corsica, France
- Crown Fried Chicken (a.k.a. Kennedy Fried Chicken), a fast food chain in the northeastern US

== Politics, law, government, and finance ==
- Cash for clunkers program
- Combined Federal Campaign, for charities to fundraise via payroll deductions from US Federal Government employees
- Controlled foreign corporation, company owned or controlled primarily by taxpayers of a different jurisdiction
- Consumption of fixed capital, accounting term for depreciation of fixed assets
- Comisión Federal de Competencia, or Federal Competition Commission, an agency of the Mexican government
- ROK/US Combined Forces Command
- United States Court of Federal Claims, a United States court

== Religion ==
- Carols for Choirs, a British collection of Christmas carol music books
- Catechism for Filipino Catholics, Roman Catholic catechism for Filipinos
- Champions for Christ, Every Nation Churches outreach to college and professional sportspeople
- Couples for Christ, a Catholic Charismatic renewal movement which seeks to preserve the sanctity of the family
- Congregatio Fratrum Christianorum, Congregation of Christian Brothers
- Catholics for Choice, Catholic pro-choice organization

== Military ==
- Combined Forces Command (disambiguation), various multi-national military commands
- China Fleet Club, British Navy club in Hong Kong
- Canadian Forestry Corps, timber-processing corps of the Canadian Army during both World Wars
- Corporal first class, the highest enlistee rank in the Singapore Armed Forces

== Entertainment and gaming ==
- SNK vs. Capcom: Card Fighters' Clash, a game released for the Neo Geo Pocket Color
- Celebrity Fit Club, a reality weight-loss show

== Sports ==
- Canadian Football Council, precursor of the Canadian Football League

=== Football clubs ===
In England: (association football)

- Chasetown F.C.
- Chelsea F.C.
- Chester F.C.
- Chesterfield F.C.
- Chipstead F.C.
- Chorley F.C.
- Clapton F.C.
- Clitheroe F.C.
- Cobham F.C.
- Cove F.C.
- Crockenhill F.C.
- Croydon F.C.

In Scotland: (association football)

- Celtic F.C.
- Clyde F.C.
- Clydebank F.C.
- Cowdenbeath F.C.

In Northern Ireland: (association football)

- Castlecaulfield F.C.
- Cavehill F.C.
- Cliftonville F.C.
- Clonard F.C.
- Clonduff F.C.
- Coleraine F.C.
- Crusaders F.C.

Other association football:

- Cebu F.C., Philippines
- Ceres F.C., Philippines
- Changwon City FC, Korea
- Charlotte FC, Charlotte, United States
- Chemnitzer FC, Germany
- Chonburi F.C., Thailand
- Cincinnati FC, Cincinnati, United States
- Cimarron F.C., Philippines
- Clermont-Ferrand Football Club, France
- Coritiba Foot Ball Club, Brazil
- Chattanooga FC, Tennessee, United States

In Australia: (Australian rules football)

- Carlton Football Club
- Clarence Football Club
- Collingwood Football Club

In India: (association football) Chennaiyin FC
