= Nature connectedness =

Connections between individuals and nature

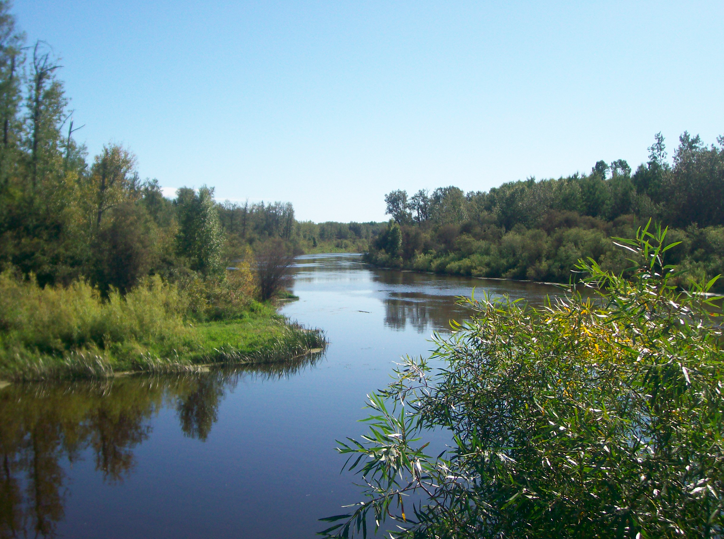

Nature connectedness is the extent to which individuals include nature as part of their identity. It includes an understanding of nature and everything it is made up of, even the parts that are not pleasing. Characteristics of nature connectedness are similar to those of a personality trait: nature connectedness is stable over time and across various situations.

Schultz describes three components that make up the nature connectedness construct:

- The cognitive component is the core of nature connectedness and refers to how integrated one feels with nature.
- The affective component is an individual's sense of care for nature.
- The behavioral component is an individual's commitment to protect the natural environment.

These three components make up nature connectedness and are required for a healthy relationship with nature. If an individual feels connected to nature (possibly by spending time in it), they may be more inclined to care about nature, and protect the environment. Recent research has found that nature exposure (and feeling connected to nature at a trait level) provides many benefits to humans such as well-being.

Other researchers describe the nature connectedness construct in a simpler manner. For instance, nature connectedness can be thought of as a love of nature (also referred to as emotional affinity toward nature). Similarly, nature connectedness can be defined as how much a person believes they are the same as nature (more specifically, a person's connectivity with nature) or it can be thought of as simply feeling emotionally connected with nature. Nature connectedness (as a construct) is also known as nature relatedness, connectivity with nature, emotional affinity toward nature, or inclusion of nature in self.

Although nature relatedness is a stable individual trait, it can change based on one's experience with nature, meaning the more time an individual spends in nature, the more connected they feel to nature and the more concern they may feel for nature. Feeling connected to nature at a state level has many benefits as well such as more positive moods and less negative moods.

Even though humans derive many benefits from nature, our modern lifestyles have created a disconnect from the natural environment wherein we spend significantly more time indoors. Some researchers estimate that humans spend up to 90% of their lives indoors. Particularly in developed countries and countries with a high rate of urbanization, the level of connection to nature is significantly lower. This disconnection from nature can have a negative impact on humans because we are missing out on the beneficial effects of nature. As a result, we are less connected to nature and feel less responsibility to protect this environment.

== Theory and biophilia ==
Our relationship with the natural environment can be understood through the concept of biophilia and the biophilia hypothesis. This term is defined as humans' innate need to affiliate with other life such as plants and animals. This essentially means that humans have a desire to be near nature. This built-in desire may be the result of spending the majority of our evolutionary history (over 99%) closely connected to nature. Biophilia is genetic, meaning those humans who were closely connected to nature throughout history would, presumably, have had better access to food and fresh water. For example, someone who lived close to water, near vegetation, or with a pet as a protector (e.g. dog) would have had survival advantages. Although evolutionary theory is difficult to test, the popularity of camping, hiking, and visiting the zoo, provide support for this theory.

In his 1997 book, Kellert proposed that biophilia (or being close to nature) also provides us benefits such as an increase in well-being. Thus, being disconnected from the natural environment should have negative effects on humans' well-being. The construct of nature connectedness is also related to a branch of psychology called ecopsychology. This branch seeks to examine how human well-being is related to the well-being of the natural environment. This theory is based on the idea that the needs of humans and nature are interdependent, so human health will suffer if nature does as well.

== Restoration ==
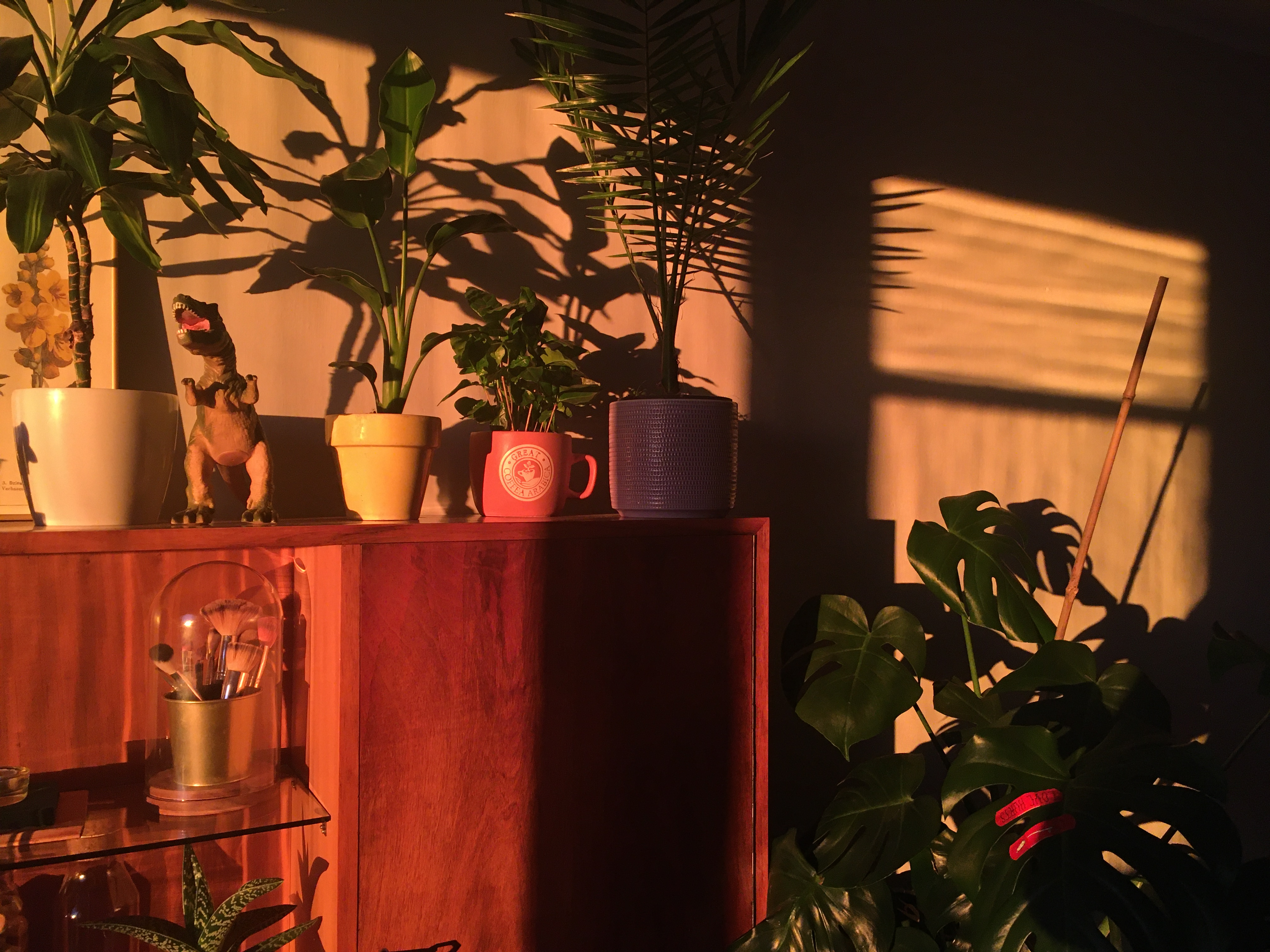
Human and plants

Many daily activities in contemporary society demand directed attention. In order to sustain that demand, effort is required to gate competing stimuli or thoughts so that one can pay attention. The constant demand of the inhibitory control may cause that directed attention to become depleted and result in attention fatigue.

Research in environmental psychology suggests that people's desire for contact with nature serves an important adaptive function, namely, psychological restoration. As yet, it remains to be empirically demonstrated that physical and psychological problems of urban living can arouse restoration needs that continuously maintain and reinforce nature-oriented preferences. One of the important aspects that environment can lead to restoration is that it has the potential to generate fascination to people; it is able to captivate so that the demand for involuntary attention of the person is lowered and the restoration can be performed. In addition to this, it should generate the feeling of being away as an escape from a certain environment or situation; extension, referring to the connection properties and environmental accessibility and compatibility between the characteristics of the environment with the goals and preferences of the individual.

== As a measurement tool ==
There are at least seventeen scales which measure how connected an individual feels to nature. The three most commonly used scales are Nature Relatedness, Nature Connectedness, and Inclusion of Nature in Self Scale.

The Nature Relatedness measure is a 21-item scale that measures how connected to nature participants feel at a trait level. Participants indicate their agreement with each statement using a Likert scale. There are three subscales to this measure; NR-self, NR-perspective, and NR- experience. NR-self measures how much individuals identify with nature (e.g., "I feel very connected to all living things and the earth"), NR-perspective measures how concerned individuals may feel about the effect of human actions on the environment (e.g., "Humans have the right to use natural resources any way we want"), and NR-experience measures how comfortable individuals are in nature and their desire to be involved with nature (e.g., "I enjoy being outdoors, even in unpleasant weather"). This scale shows good reliability, alpha = .87 and test-retest stability six months later, alpha = .85. There is also a brief Nature Relatedness Scale made up of six items from the original 21 items. The purpose of this scale is to measure how connected an individual feels to nature but in a shorter way. This scale shows good reliability, alpha = .87 and test-retest stability six months later, alpha = .88.

The Connectedness to Nature Scale (CNS). This scale measures how emotionally connected people feel to the natural world, animals, and plants. It also assesses people's perceived equality between nature and themselves. An example of an item is "I recognize and appreciate the intelligence of other living organisms." These items are rated on a Likert scale from 1 (strongly disagree) to 5 (strongly agree) where higher scores demonstrate a higher connection to nature. This scale can be used both at the trait and state level. The state version is 13 items and shows acceptable reliability (α = .91,). The trait version is 14 items and also demonstrates good reliability (α = .82). This scale's validity is demonstrated by its positive associations with other environmental scales (such as the New Ecological Paradigm Scale) but is not associated with verbal ability or social desirability. See also Connectedness to nature scale.

Inclusion of Nature in Self Scale (INS) This single-item question was designed to measure the extent that individuals include nature as part of their identity. This measure uses a pair of circles with one circle labeled self and the other circle labeled nature. Participants are asked to choose the pair of circles that best describes their relationship with the natural environment. There are seven pairs of circles that differ on the extent that they overlap. Individuals who are very connected to nature choose the pair of circles that completely overlap (scored as a 7) while individuals who are not connected to nature choose circles that are non-overlapping (scored as a 1). This scale has been shown to correlate positively with the New Ecological Paradigm Revised Scale, nature relatedness and simply walking in nature. This scale can also be used to measure how connected to nature people feel in the moment (or at a state level) by changing the wording to "how interconnected are you with nature RIGHT NOW." Below is the INS scale.

Other ways to measure an individual's connection to nature include the Allo-Inclusive Scale and the Implicit Associates Test-Nature.

The Allo-Inclusive Scale is adapted from the Inclusion of Others in the Self (IOS) Scale by Aron et al. (1992). The Allo-Inclusive Scale contains seven pairs of Venn diagrams that range in how far apart the circles are. In the first pair, there is no overlap, but as you get to the second or third pair, the circles begin to overlap more and more. In the last pair (the seventh pair), the circles completely overlap. Participants respond to eight items by choosing the pair of circles that best denotes their connection with that particular item. A sample item is "The connection between you and a wild animal (such as a squirrel, deer, or wolf)." There are also eight other items to this scale that assess how connected participants feel to people. This scale shows acceptable reliability (Cronbach's α = 0.75) and validity (correlations with concern for environment). This scale is not contaminated with social desirability biases. The NR scale, the Allo-Inclusive scale, and the CN scale are highly correlated with one another, suggesting they are all part of the nature-connectedness construct.

Implicit Associates Test-Nature (IAT) seeks to measure participant's implicit attitudes towards the two targets of self and nature (although the IAT can also measure other associations). This measure is completed on a computer by working with 150 stimulus words. The stimulus words contain 25 insect names, 25 flower names, 25 musical instrument names, 25 weapon names, 25 pleasant-meaning words, and 25 unpleasant-meaning words. The participants are shown a set of words and then press a key in response to the words. The participants' reaction times represent their connection between themselves and nature (faster times mean higher connection).

The Illustrated Inclusion of Nature in Self Scale (IINS) is a graphical extension of the Inclusion of Nature in Self Scale. As with the original scale, it is a single-item question that measures nature connectedness with seven circle pairs that overlap to varying degrees. The IINS was developed to measure the nature connectedness of young students or people with special cognitive needs. For this purpose, the original circle pairs were extended by graphical elements created on the basis of children's perception of nature. The scale shows a high positive correlation with the Connectedness to Nature Scale (CNS) and the Nature Relatedness Scale (NR).

== As a personality trait ==
In personality psychology, researchers have generally agreed on a five-factor model of personality. The five factors are extraversion (i.e. social, outgoing), agreeableness (i.e. trusting, helpful), neuroticism (i.e. worried, anxious), openness to experience (i.e. imaginative, creative), and conscientiousness (i.e. organized, careful). Nature relatedness (overall) is significantly related to extraversion, agreeableness, conscientiousness, and openness to experience. In addition, a subscale of nature relatedness (nature-relatedness experience) is negatively related with neuroticism. These authors describe the nature-relatedness person as someone who is more adventurous, easygoing, and gregarious. It may also be that highly nature-related people are more environmental friendly because of the positive (albeit weak) relationship with conscientiousness. Evidence suggests that people vary in their subjective sense of connectedness with nature much like any of the five factors listed above. Supportive of these results, a recent study has found that environmental engagement (protecting the environment, electricity conservation and environmental values) is related to agreeableness, conscientiousness and openness to experience. Another study found that nature connectedness accounted for (mediated) the relationship between openness and pro-environmental behaviours.

== Relationship with well-being ==
Nature connectedness is related to subjective well-being and other indicators of positive functioning such as solving a problem in one's life. Subjective well-being is defined as feeling pleasant emotions or having pleasant experiences. To assess well-being, participants complete measures of how often they feel positive emotions (an affective measure), how often they feel negative emotions (an affective measure), and how satisfied they are with their lives (a cognitive measure). Individuals with higher levels of well-being typically indicate that they are satisfied with their lives, feel more positive emotions, and less negative emotions.

At a broad level, the construct of trait nature connectedness is associated with well-being. This means that individuals who are highly connected to nature also report higher psychological well-being (i.e., greater acceptance of self), and social well-being (i.e., socially integrated). Emotional well-being (i.e., positive emotions and life satisfaction) is related to nature connectedness but less consistently However, psychological and social well-being are consistently related to nature connectedness suggesting that feeling connected to nature is related to participant's well-being in their personal and social lives. Trait nature relatedness is significantly correlated with psychological well-being and its six dimensions: autonomy, environmental mastery, positive relations with others, self-acceptance, purpose in life, and personal growth. More specifically, nature relatedness relates to all six dimensions (in a sample with undergraduate students), and relates with autonomy, purpose in life, and personal growth (in a sample with businesspeople). It also significantly relates to positive affect in both populations. Finally, nature connectedness is associated with mindfulness. In recent years, a great deal of research has examined the benefits of mindfulness such as increased self-awareness, self-esteem, resilience and reduced maladaptive rumination. The awareness subscale (of mindfulness) correlates with nature connectedness, but the other subscale of mindfulness (the acceptance subscale) does not consistently correlate. As the authors state, this suggests that mindfulness is related to a person's awareness in nature and their experiences in nature but not with whether they accept these experiences or not.

There are also many benefits from feeling connected to nature at the state level. Simply walking in nature for fifteen minutes (in comparison to walking in an urban environment) increases an individual's subjective connectedness to nature, positive affect, attentional capacity (as measured by the number of errors they made in a cognitive task) and their ability to reflect on a life problem. A life problem could be anything from finding enough time to study to resolving a fight participants had with close friends, significant others, or family members. These relationships were mediated by state nature connectedness (not attentional capacity or self-awareness as previously suggested). State nature connectedness has also been found to relate to vitality. Vitality is defined as having both physical and mental energy and it increases positive affect. In five studies, researchers found that nature exposure relates to vitality at a state level. Nature exposure is also related to other indicators of positive functioning such as aspirations and goals. Nature exposure increases intrinsic aspirations (personal growth, intimacy, and community) and decreases extrinsic aspirations (money, image, fame) at a state level. The achievement of intrinsic goals relates to well-being, whereas the achievement of extrinsic aspirations relates to ill-being. Nature connectedness and autonomy were found to mediate the relation between nature exposure and intrinsic/extrinsic aspirations. Nature exposure also increased participants' generosity as measured by the amount of money they chose to donate to another student. As participants' immersion increased in the nature slides, their intrinsic aspirations and generosity did as well. However, as participants' immersion increased in the non-nature (or built) slides, their extrinsic aspirations increased while their generosity decreased.

Finally, even subtle nature manipulations can increase well-being or other indicators of well-being. For instance, simply having plants in a lab can increase intrinsic aspirations, decrease extrinsic aspirations, and encourage more generous decision-making. These effects were also mediated by nature connectedness and autonomy. Also, virtual nature has been found to provide some psychological benefits (but not as much as real nature). These studies demonstrate the positive relationship between nature exposure, feeling connected to nature, and subjective well-being.

=== Relationship with mental health ===
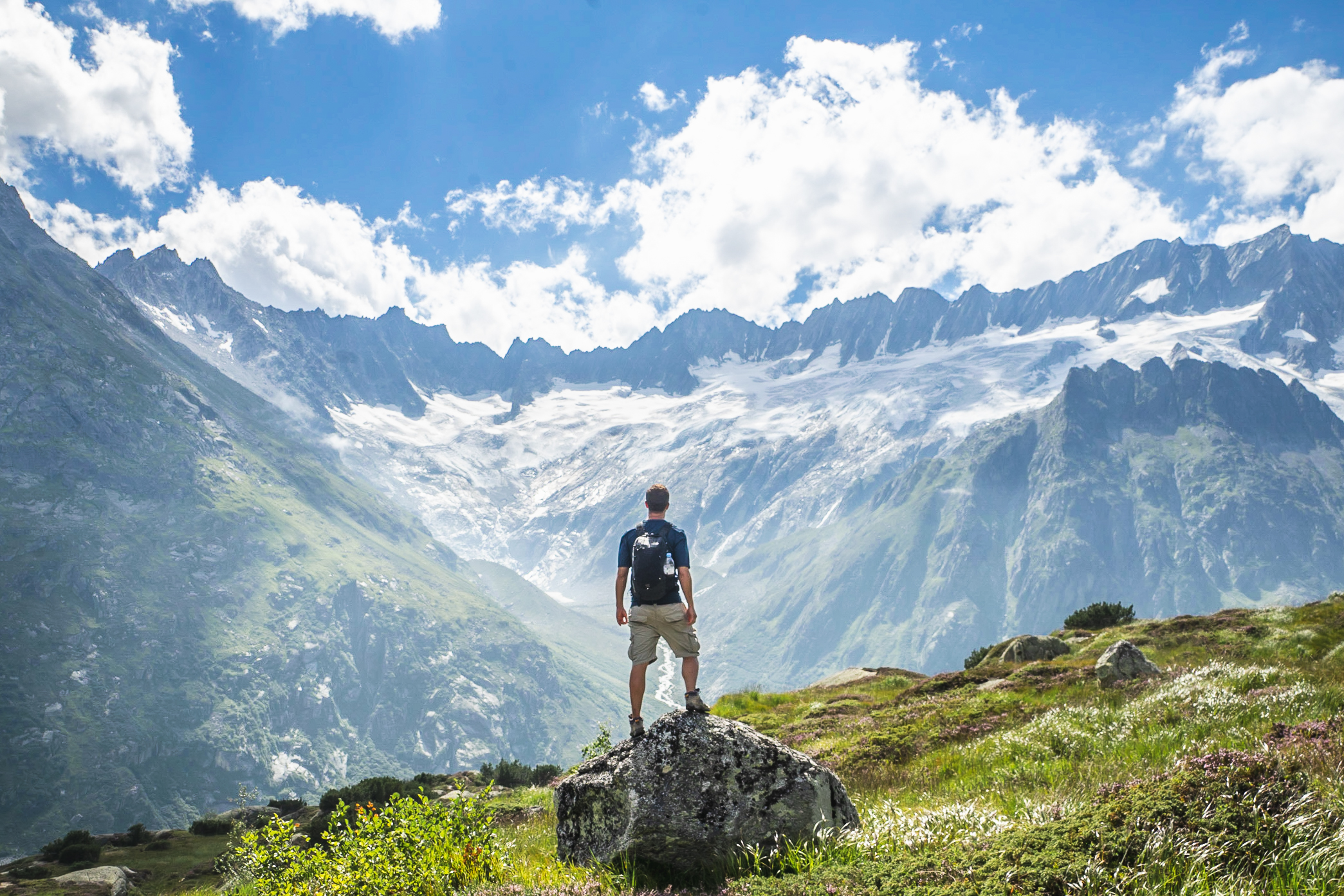
Person standing in front of Swiss Alps

Nature exposure and mental health refers to the association between an individual interacting with natural environments and its effect on the individual's mental health. Most studies consider any interaction with nature as exposure, such as a hike, being in a forest or a place with water (e.g. lake, beach), going on a walk in a park, etc. Currently there is extensive research on the impact of the exposure to nature on people, which finds a beneficial association in various ways. Studies show that the contact of human beings with nature has decreased with the contemporary lifestyle of being most of the time indoors and with increasing time spent on screens. However, the interaction with nature has been considered to be a general health promoter thanks to the many benefits it brings to mental health and cognition as well. As a consequence, therapists use nature in their treatments to improve mental or physical health. These treatments and techniques are called ecotherapy.

== Environmental relationship ==
Researchers believe that if humans feel a part of nature and are more connected to nature, they will feel a responsibility to care for nature and protect it. As Stephen Jay Gould said:

"We cannot win this battle to save species and environments without forging an emotional bond between ourselves and nature as well – for we will not fight to save what we do not love." (p.425)

So far, research has provided support for the assertion that nature connectedness (at a subjective level) is a reliable predictor of environmental behaviors. For instance, nature relatedness was found to relate to concern for the environment, as people who scored high on nature relatedness were also more likely to belong to environmental organizations, and declare themselves environmentalists. High nature-related people at the trait level (or individuals scoring high on one of the subscales of nature relatedness) were also more likely to self-report

- buying organic foods and products
- buying fair-trade products
- loving animals and having a pet
- being a vegan
- participating in nature activities
- actually spending more time in nature
- considering future consequences

Research has shown that individuals who think ahead and consider future events (individuals with a high consideration of future consequences) are more environmentally friendly. These individuals also show more concern for the environment and are more critical of environmental damage.

More research has also found that trait nature connectedness is related to

- perspective taking
- biospheric attitudes
- environmentalism
- negatively related with consumerism
- concern for nature

Thus, the research mentioned suggests that feeling connected to nature decreases the likelihood that people will harm it because harming nature would be similar to harming oneself.

== Nature experiences ==
A global review summarized the scarce data on a likely largely declining "experience of nature" (EoN) and nature disconnection which prior studies suggest have impacts on health and pro-environmental behavior. Eighteen included studies measured temporal trends in EoN. Data on the presence of nature in cultural products, such as movies or books, was used as well. As "an initial proxy for understudied regions", data on locations where humans live (away from the natural world, becoming more urban), and forest cover in cities (decreasing) was used. The researchers conclude that "existing evidence is insufficient to assess the magnitude and generality of this phenomenon".

Another review concluded that "[w]ithin a generation, children's lives have largely moved indoors" and that "research indicates that direct experiences of nature in childhood contribute to care for nature across the life span."

== Implications of feeling connected to nature ==
Although nature relatedness is a stable individual trait, it can change based on one's experience with nature, so that people feel more connected to nature (and are more concerned about nature) after exposure to nature Spending time in nature (and feeling connected to nature) may be one way to motivate environmentally friendly behaviours. As these authors and Kaplan explain, motivating ecological behaviours by increasing the connection to the natural environment may be more effective than establishing laws and rules that people have to follow.

Feeling connected to nature may also be of benefit to the following people and organizations:

- The benefits of nature and feeling connected to nature may be beneficial to keep in mind when creating settings for patients at a hospital, or in therapy sessions. Also, because virtual nature can provide benefits to people (but in a less dramatic way), this may be one way for people who cannot get out in nature to reap some of its benefits.
- Increasing nature exposure and the accessibility to green space in cities may increase the well-being and ecological behaviors of individuals. This highlights the importance of green space for policymakers and city planners.
- Promote programs that value nature and wildlife to get individuals more involved in with the environment. One way to accomplish this may be to encourage researchers, practitioners, and government agencies to emphasize environmental behaviours from a more intrinsic point of view. For instance, positively framing environmental messages may be more effective than fearful messages
- Through nature connectedness and relatedness, we may be able to further understand the destruction of our planet.
- Nature connectedness could be used as a measurement tool to evaluate whether architectural variables (windows, view of nature, plants in the workplace) are effective for increasing human's connection to the environment and motivating more pro-environmental behaviours
- Exposure to nature can have "humanizing effects, fostering greater authenticity and connectedness and, in turn, other versus self-orientations that enhance valuing of and generosity toward others" (p. 1328).
- Nature-based settings could enhance some aspects of the preparation and integration phases of psychedelic therapy, and the psychedelic sessions themselves. A positive association between psychedelic use and nature relatedness has been studied.
- Contact with nature is associated with improved cognitive function, blood pressure, brain activity, mental health, physical activity, and sleep.

== Limitations ==
Although the topic of nature connectedness is a flourishing area of research today, there are still limitations such as

- Many of the studies referenced used correlational designs. Correlation does not mean causation, so just because two variables are related, this does not imply one causes another. A meta-analysis examining the role of nature connectedness on pro-environmental behavior (such as recycling) confirmed the strong correlation between the two measures; however, it found nature connectedness had a weaker causal role on pro-environmental behaviour than what was assumed from the correlational evidence. Future research has yet to examine the causal role between nature connectedness and well-being.
- Many of the environmental scales measure an individual's intent to participate in environmental behaviours, which does not always translate into behaviour. Studies may also use self-report measures that may or may not fully represent their actual behaviours. Future research should examine how environmentally friendly intents transfer into behaviours and further investigate the validity of self-reports.
- Much of the research has used an undergraduate population in their studies which may or may not transfer to the general population.

== See also ==
- Attention restoration theory
- Earth Day
- Ecological empathy
- Ecopsychology
- Environmental psychology
- Pantheism
- Place identity
