= Experimentum crucis =

Critical experiment

In science, an experimentum crucis (English: crucial experiment or critical experiment) is an experiment capable of decisively determining whether or not a particular hypothesis or theory is superior to all others whose acceptance is currently widespread in the scientific community. In particular, such an experiment—if true—must typically be able to produce a result that rules out all other hypotheses or theories, thereby demonstrating that under the conditions of the experiment (i.e., under the same external circumstances and for the same "input variables" within the experiment), those hypotheses and theories are proven false but the experimenter's hypothesis is not ruled out.

An opposite view, rejecting the decisive value of the experimentum crucis in choosing one hypothesis or theory over its rivals, is the Duhem–Quine thesis.

== History ==
Francis Bacon in his Novum Organum first described the concept of a situation in which one theory but not others would hold true, using the name instantia crucis ("crucial instance"). The phrase experimentum crucis, denoting the deliberate creation of such a situation for the purpose of testing the rival theories, was later coined by Robert Hooke and then famously used by Isaac Newton and Robert Boyle.

The production of such an experiment is considered necessary for a particular hypothesis or theory to be considered an established part of the body of scientific knowledge. It is not unusual in the history of science for theories to be developed fully before producing a critical experiment. A given theory which is in accordance with known experiment but which has not yet produced a critical experiment is typically considered worthy of exploration in order to discover such an experimental test.

== Examples ==
Robert Boyle was the first person to hail an experiment as experimentum crucis when he referred to the famous mercury barometer experiment on Puy-de-Dome in 1648. This experiment settled the question: Was there some natural resistance to the creation of an apparently empty space at the top of the tube, or was the height of the mercury determined solely by the weight of the air?

In his Philosophiæ Naturalis Principia Mathematica, Isaac Newton (1687) presents a disproof of Descartes' vortex theory of the motion of the planets. In his Opticks, Newton describes an optical experimentum crucis in the First Book, Part I, Proposition II, Theorem II, Experiment 6, to prove that sunlight consists of rays that differ in their index of refraction.

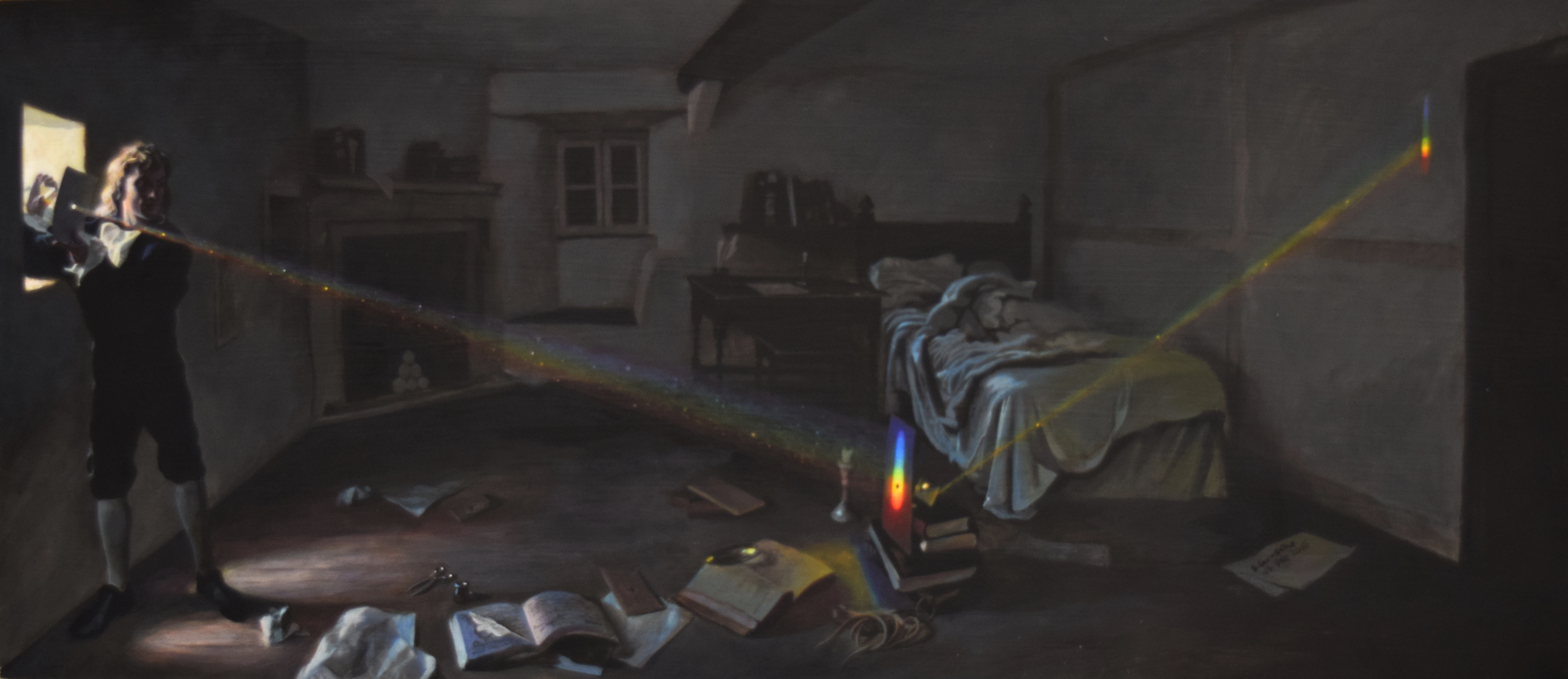
Isaac Newton performing his crucial prism experiment – the 'experimentum crucis' – in his Woolsthorpe Manor bedroom. Acrylic painting by Sascha Grusche (17 Dec 2015)

A 19th-century example was the prediction by Siméon Denis Poisson, based on Augustin-Jean Fresnel's mathematical analysis, that the wave theory of light predicted a bright spot in the center of the shadow of a perfectly circular object, a result that could not be explained by the (then current) particle theory of light. An experiment by François Arago showed the existence of this effect, now called the Arago spot, or "Poisson's bright spot", which led to the acceptance of the wave theory.

A famous example in the 20th century of an experimentum crucis was the expedition led by Arthur Eddington to Principe Island in Africa in 1919 to record the positions of stars around the Sun during a solar eclipse (see Eddington experiment). The observation of star positions confirmed predictions of gravitational lensing made by Albert Einstein in the general theory of relativity published in 1915. Eddington's observations were considered to be the first solid evidence in favor of Einstein's theory.

In some cases, a proposed theory can account for existing anomalous experimental results for which no other existing theory can furnish an explanation. An example would be the ability of the quantum hypothesis, proposed by Max Planck in 1900, to account for the observed black-body spectrum, an experimental result that the existing classical Rayleigh–Jeans law could not predict. Such cases are not considered strong enough to fully establish a new theory, however, and in the case of quantum mechanics, it took the confirmation of the theory through new predictions for the theory to gain full acceptance.

=== DNA, experimentum crucis ===
See §Context for crucial experiment in the discovery of the §structure of DNA, and §List of experiments in biology

In the discovery of the significance of the structure of DNA, the fact that DNA was a double helix enabled the discoverers, Francis Crick and James Watson, to suggest that one strand of the double helix could serve as the template for the second strand, as the second strand was being duplicated. This explained the secret of life, how the structure of DNA could serve as the mechanism for the gene (the genetic code), in which four nucleotides serve to encode the sequence of enzymes needed to catalyze the production of macromolecules in the cell, and which led to its application in synthetic biology, in genetic engineering, in forensics, genetic testing, genomics and pharmaceuticals, among other industries.

=== Tanis fossil site ===
In the 21st century, the discovery of the Tanis fossil site, a killing field in the Hell Creek formation of North Dakota, proved that the K-T boundary (now known as the KPg, or the Cretaceous–Paleogene extinction event) was the same event (the Chicxulub impact) which killed off the dinosaurs. This impact event was previously hypothesized from the global existence of iridium deposits (a rare element on Earth). In this case, the existence of a microtektite layer raining down upon the multiple intermixed species (including a Triceratops) which were found at the site (the Tanis Konservat-Lagerstätte) served as the conclusive witness, as cited in Science Daily. Based on the dating of the Tanis, the event occurred 65.76 million years ago (± 0.15 My).

=== Theory of Experimentum Crucis ===
There's an emerging scholarship extending understanding and evaluation of experiments that fit into this category. J. A. Lohne tracks the development of the idea from Francis Bacon's 1620 Instantie Crucis through the various prism optics experiments and discussions of 1722.

An early indicator of a theory of Experimentum Crucis appears in John Locke's Doctrine of Abstraction.

Lorne Falkenstein, reviewing Van Cleve expands the discussion of Experimentum crucis to the more general philosophical realm of Property dualism.

== See also ==
- Contraposition in logic, the formal basis of an experimentum crucis
- Cross-validation (disambiguation)
- Pierre Duhem § Philosophy of science
- Falsifiability
- Material conditional
- Q.E.D.
- Scientific method
- Smoking gun
- Therefore sign
