= Tamsin Ford =

British psychiatrist

Tamsin Ford CBE, FRCPsych, FMedSci
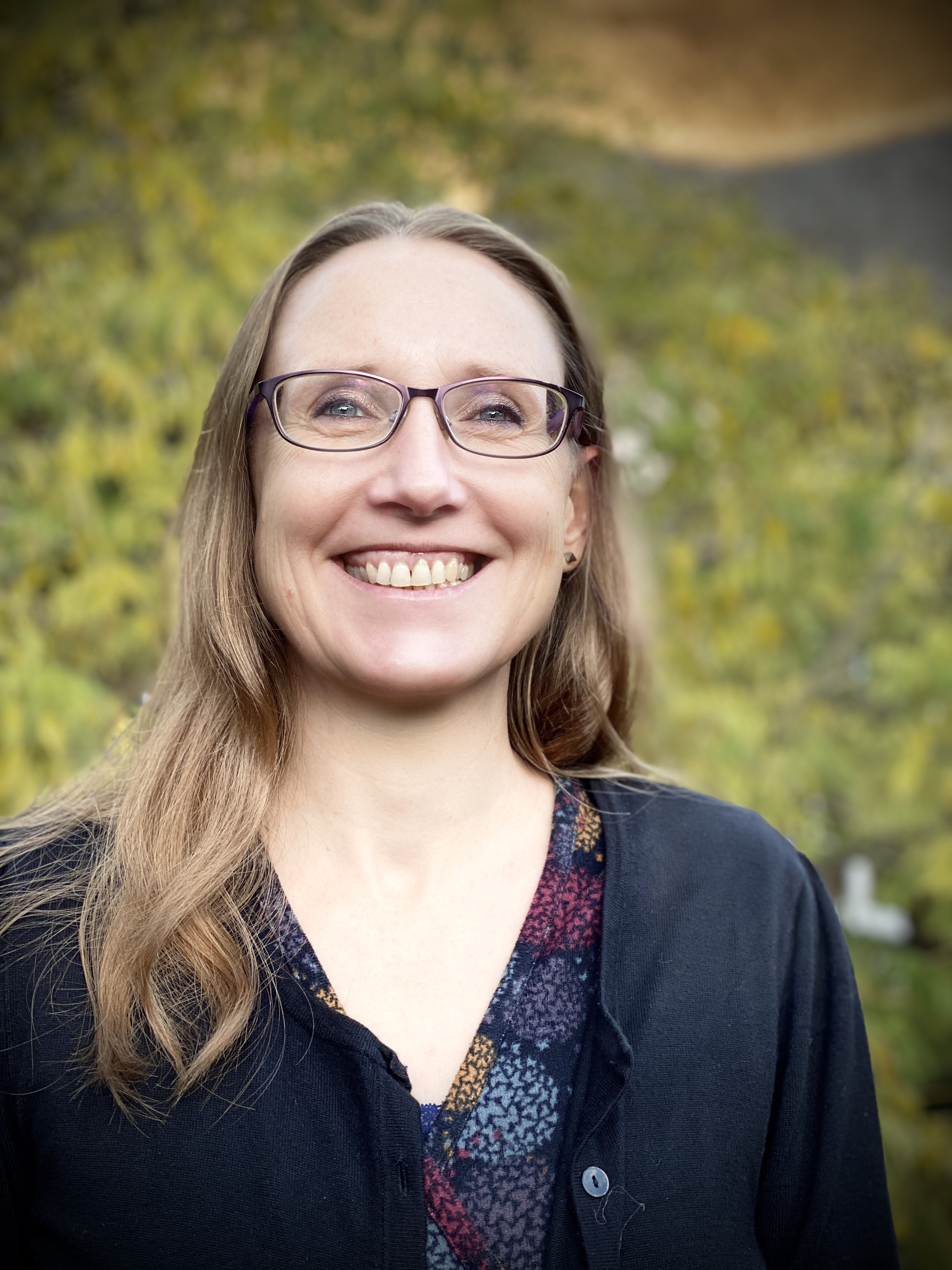
- Born: 17 September 1966 (age 60)
- Education: London School of Hygiene & Tropical Medicine; University of London
- Spouse: Dr Jim Cromwell
- Awards: CBE, FRCPsych, FMedSci
- Scientific career
- Fields: Child & adolescent psychiatry
- Workplaces: University of Cambridge
- Website: www.psychiatry.cam.ac.uk//

Tamsin Jane Ford (born 17 September 1966) is a British psychiatrist specialising in children's mental health. Since 2019 she has been based at the University of Cambridge, where she is now professor of Child and Adolescent Psychiatry, head of the Department of Psychiatry and fellow of Hughes Hall. She has been heavily involved with the Incredible Years Teacher Classroom Management (TCM) programme, created by Carolyn Webster-Stratton, which aims to raise and improve children's mental health in primary schools across Devon. Her work also ties in with the Strengths and Difficulties Questionnaire (SDQ), created by UK psychiatrist, Robert Goodman.

== Education ==
Ford received a MB BS degree from United Medical Schools of Guy's and St Thomas's, University of London in 1990. As a junior doctor in 1991–1992, she held posts at Guy's and Lewisham Hospital (surgery), Orpington Hospital (medicine), King's College Hospital (A&E) and Royal London Hospital (eldercare). She began her core professional training in psychiatry in 1992, passing her MRCPsych examination in 1995. She was then appointed senior registrar in Child and Adolescent Psychiatry with the Bethlem and Maudsley NHS Trust, obtaining a CCST in 1998.

Between 1995 and 2005, Ford did her fellowship in Child and Adolescent Psychiatry at the Institute of Psychiatry, King's College London while working in the Clinical Research Worker Department at King's, as well as holding clinical posts at Great Ormond Street Hospital (Tourette's Clinic and Epilepsy Surgery Clinic) and Maudsley Hospital (National and Specialist OCD Clinic). Ford received a MSc degree (distinction) in Epidemiology at the London School of Hygiene and Tropical Medicine in 2000, followed by a PhD degree in 2004 with the thesis "Services for Children with mental health disorders: rates and predictors of specialist service use".

Towards the end of her fellowship, Ford worked briefly for the Croydon Child and Adolescent Mental Health Service as a member of their Children Looked After Team. She was also one of the editors of the book A Practical Psychiatric Epidemiology published in 2003, which was highly commended in the BMA book competition held the following year. In 2005, she was appointed MRC clinician scientist for the Department of Child and Adolescent Psychiatry at the Institute of Psychiatry, King's College London.

== Career ==
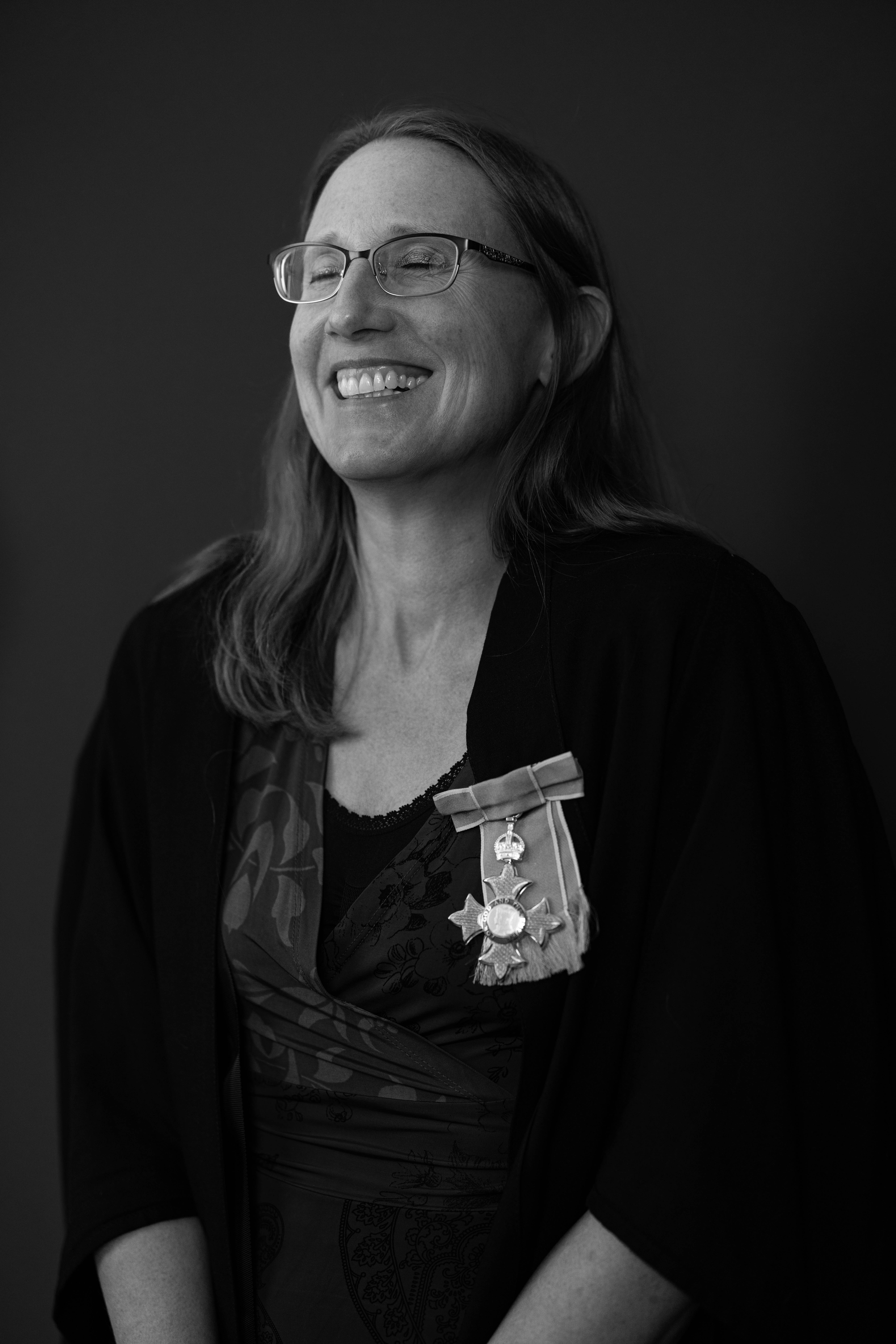
Professor Tamsin Ford CBE

In 2005, Ford was appointed MRC clinician scientist for the Department of Child and Adolescent Psychiatry at the Institute of Psychiatry, King's College London.

In 2007, she moved to Exeter, Devon, where she was appointed clinical senior lecturer at the Peninsula Medical School, University of Exeter, setting up the Child Mental Health Research Group in September. At the beginning of 2008, she was appointed to the Exeter and Mid Devon Child and Adolescent Mental Health Service (Devon Partnership NHS Trust) as an honorary consultant. Later that year, her publication "Five years on: public sector service use related to mental health in young people with ADHD or hyperkinetic disorder five years after diagnosis", of which she was a co-author, was selected as one of the top ten publications of the year by editors of the Child and Adolescent Mental Health journal.

Another honorary consultant role followed in May 2011, when Ford was appointed to the Exeter Liaison team on the Devon NHS Partnership Trust. Two years later, she was appointed as personal chair of Child and Adolescent Psychiatry at the University of Exeter Medical School. In 2014, she was appointed a FRCPsych, and became a Fellow of the Academy of Medical Sciences in 2020. In 2012, Ford started setting up of the Incredible Years Teacher Classroom Management (TCM) programme to promote awareness and understanding of mental health in children aged 6–11; by 2018, this programme was implemented in 80 Devon primary schools. In 2018, Ford was voted as one of the 100 most influential women in Exeter by Grow Exeter.

In summer 2019, Ford was appointed a CBE for her work in transforming mental health services and schools in the United Kingdom, with her work regularly cited in government, NHS and education policy.

She moved to the University of Cambridge Department of Psychiatry in 2019.

== Honours ==
- Fellow of the Academy of Medical Sciences
- CBE
- Fellow of the Royal College of Psychiatrists
- Chair of the Child and Adolescent Psychiatry Surveillance Service
- Founder member of the Child Outcome Research Consortium (CORC)

== Selected publications ==
- Prince, Martin; Stewart, Robert; Ford, Tamsin; Hotopf, Martin, eds. (2004). A Practical Psychiatric Epidemiology. Oxford: Oxford University Press. ISBN 9780198515517. (Note: Highly commended in the 2004 BMA book competition.)
- Ford, Tamsin; Fowler, Tom; Langley, Kate; Whittinger, Naureen; Thapar, Anita (11 August 2008). "Five years on: public sector service use related to mental health in young people with ADHD or hyperkinetic disorder five years after diagnosis". Child and Adolescent Mental Health. 13 (3): 122–129. doi:10.1111/j.1475-3588.2007.00466.x. hdl:10871/17453. PMID 32847180. S2CID 143703683. (Note: This paper was selected by editors of Child and Adolescent Mental Health as one of the top ten publications of 2008.)
- Ford, Tamsin; Hutchings, Judy; Bywater, Tracey; Goodman, Anna; Goodman, Robert (June 2009). "Evaluation of the Strengths and Difficulties Questionnaire Added Value Score as a method for estimating effectiveness in child mental health interventions". The British Journal of Psychiatry. 194 (6): 552–557. doi:10.1192/bjp.bp.108.052373. hdl:10871/13812. PMID 19478298.
- Stateva, Milena; Minton, Jacqueline; Beckett, Celia; Doolan, Moira; Ford, Tamsin; Kallitsoglou, Angeliki; Scott, Stephen (November 2012). "Challenges recruiting families with anti-social children into intervention trials: lessons from the Helping Children Achieve (HCA) Study". Journal of Children's Services. 7 (4): 285–302. doi:10.1108/17466661211286508.
- Snell, Tom; Knapp, Martin; Healey, Andrew; Guglani, Sacha; Evans-Lacko, Sara; Fernandez, Jose-Luis; Meltzer, Howard; Ford, Tamsin (27 February 2013). "Economic impact of childhood psychiatric disorder on public sector services in Britain: estimates from national survey data". Journal of Child Psychology and Psychiatry. 54 (9): 977–985. doi:10.1111/jcpp.12055. PMID 23442096.
- Lang, Iain; Marlow, Ruth; Goodman, Robert; Meltzer, Howard; Ford, Tamsin (May 2013). "Influence of problematic child-teacher relationships on future psychiatric disorder: population survey with 3-year follow-up". The British Journal of Psychiatry. 202 (5): 336–341. doi:10.1192/bjp.bp.112.120741. hdl:10871/13811. PMID 23637109.
- Hurst, Alison; Price, Anna; Walesby, Rebecca; Doolan, Moira; Lanham, Wendy; Ford, Tamsin (March 2014). "Routine Outcome Monitoring of Evidence Based Parenting Programmes: Indications of effectiveness in a community context". Journal of Children's Services. 9 (1): 58–74. doi:10.1108/JCS-09-2013-0030.
- Moore, Darren; Richardson, Michelle; Gwernan-Jones, Ruth; Thompson-Coon, Jo; Stein, Ken; Rogers, Morwenna; Garside, Ruth; Logan, Stuart; Ford, Tamsin (9 March 2015). "Non-pharmacological interventions for ADHD in school settings: an overarching synthesis of systematic reviews". Journal of Attention Disorders. 23 (3): 220–233. doi:10.1177/1087054715573994. hdl:10871/18918. PMID 25755258. S2CID 488471.
- Hansford, Lorraine; Sharkey, Siobhan; Edwards, Vanessa; Ukoumunne, Obioha; Byford, Sarah; Norwich, Brahm; Logan, Stuart; Ford, Tasmin (December 2015). "Understanding influences on teachers' uptake and use of behaviour management strategies within the STARS trial: process evaluation protocol for a randomised controlled trial". BMC Public Health. 15 (1): 119. doi:10.1186/s12889-015-1486-y. PMC 4336516. PMID 25884803.
- Owens, Christabel; Hansford, Lorraine; Sharkey, Siobhan; Ford, Tamsin (March 2016). "Needs and fears of young people presenting at accident and emergency department following an act of self-harm: secondary analysis of qualitative data". The British Journal of Psychiatry. 208 (5): 286–292. doi:10.1192/bjp.bp.113.141242. PMC 4807637. PMID 26450583.
- Kidger, Judi; Brockman, Rowan; Tilling, Kate; Campbell, Rona; Ford, Tamsin; Araya, Ricardo; King, Michael; Gunnell, David (March 2016). "Teachers' wellbeing and depressive symptoms, and associated risk factors: A large cross sectional study in English secondary schools". Journal of Affective Disorders. 192: 76–82. doi:10.1016/j.jad.2015.11.054. hdl:1983/1b23891f-ed2c-4d9b-886b-4bf911f0cef8. PMID 26707351.
- Norman, Shelley Marie; Ford, Tamsin; Henley, William; Goodman, Robert (20 June 2016). "A comparison of parent reported outcome with experience of services". Journal of Children's Services. 11 (2): 157–169. doi:10.1108/JCS-04-2015-0015. hdl:10871/22550.
- Ford, Tamsin; Macdiarmid, Fiona; Russell, Abigail; Racey, Daniel; Goodman, Robert (April 2017). "The predictors of persistent DSM-IV disorders in 3-year follow-ups of the British Child and Adolescent Mental Health Surveys 1999 and 2004" (PDF). Psychological Medicine. 47 (6): 1126–1137. doi:10.1017/S0033291716003214. hdl:10871/25228. PMID 27995813. S2CID 8832326.
- Ford, Tamsin; Parker, Claire; Salim, Javid; Goodman, Robert; Logan, Stuart; Henley, William (March 2018). "The relationship between exclusion from school and mental health: a secondary analysis of the British Child and Adolescent Mental Health Surveys 2004 and 2007". Psychological Medicine. 48 (4): 629–641. doi:10.1017/S003329171700215X. hdl:10871/28337. PMID 28838327. S2CID 20469599.
