= Incremental validity =

Method of deducing if a new experiment gives more information than pre-existing ones

Incremental validity is a type of statistical validity that assesses whether a new psychometric assessment has more predictive ability than existing methods of assessment. It seeks to determine whether the new assessment adds information that cannot be obtained with simpler, already existing methods.

New psychometric instruments are often assessed on whether it can increase knowledge of an outcome variable beyond what is already known based on existing instruments. If the instrument is less successful than an existing tool, then it is incrementally invalid.

Incremental validity is usually assessed using multiple regression methods, involving a regression model with other variables fitted to the data and another model with the focal variable added. Using an F-test to determine significance, a significant difference in the R-square statistic reflects the percent of variance explained by the added variable, indicating whether that variable offers significant additional predictive power for the dependent variable over other variables. Using the change in R-square is more appropriate than mere raw correlations, because the raw correlations do not reflect the overlap of the newly introduced measure and the existing measures.

For example, the College Board has used multiple regression models to assess the incremental validity of a revised SAT test.

== See also ==
- Predictive validity
- Criterion validity
