= Mina Fazel =

British psychiatrist

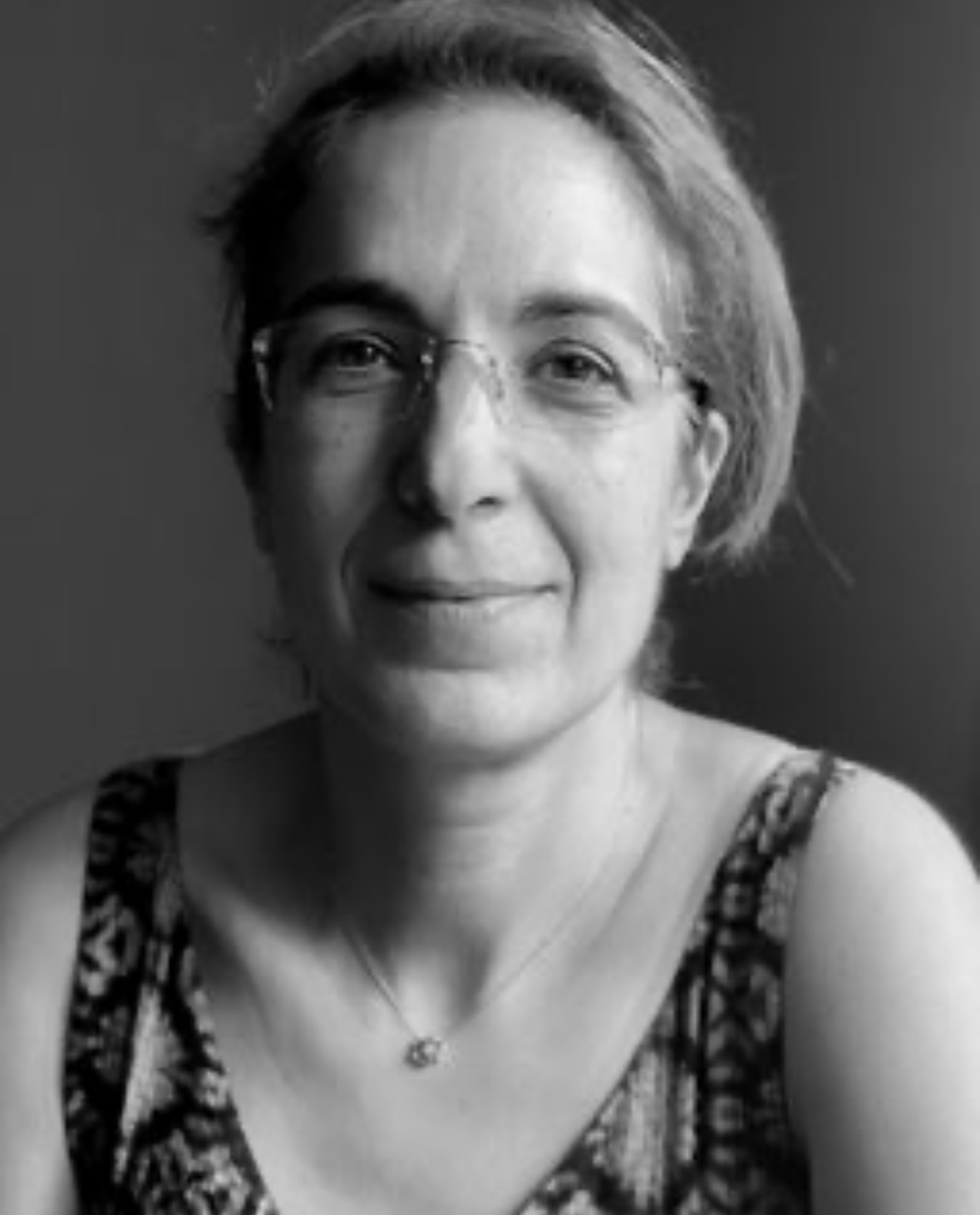
- Education: University of Cambridge; University of Oxford
- Scientific career
- Workplaces: Oxford Children's Hospital; University of Oxford; National Institute for Health and Care Research

Mina Fazel is a British psychiatrist who is Professor and Chair of Child and Adolescent Psychiatry in the Department of Psychiatry at the University of Oxford. Her research considers the mental health of children and young people, and how to design effective mental health interventions.

== Early life and education ==
Fazel studied medicine and social anthropology at the University of Cambridge and completed her clinical training at the University of Oxford. She remained in Oxford for her specialist training in psychiatry and child and adolescent psychiatry.

== Career and research ==
While a National Institute for Health and Care Research postdoctoral researcher, Fazel developed a mental health toolbox for front-line workers to use in educational institutions. She is a consultant in child and adolescent psychiatry with the children's psychological medicine team at the Oxford Children's Hospital and a professor in the Department of Psychiatry at the University of Oxford, where in 2024 she was appointed Chair of Child and Adolescent Psychiatry.

Fazel researches methodologies for improving the mental health of children and young people, with emphases on mental health services in schools and on child refugees. She has researched the impact of multiple adversities on young people's mental health, and the causes of school exclusions. Her research group, Team Intervene, seek to identify barriers to youth access to mental health support and to develop and deliver effective interventions. She coordinates the OxWell Student Survey, which assesses the mental health needs of schoolchildren and what types of support they find most useful. She has explored the epidemiology of mental health challenges in refugee children and the psychological impacts of immigration detention. She has investigated narrative exposure therapy as a treatment for post-traumatic stress disorder in refugee children.

MindKind, a Wellcome Trust programme led by Fazel, advocated for the creation of a global mental health databank.

== Selected publications ==
- Mina Fazel; Jeremy Wheeler; John Danesh (1 April 2005). "Prevalence of serious mental disorder in 7000 refugees resettled in western countries: a systematic review". The Lancet. 365 (9467): 1309–1314. doi:10.1016/s0140-6736(05)61027-6. ISSN 0140-6736. PMID 15823380. Wikidata Q36095049.
- Mina Fazel; Ruth V Reed; Catherine Panter-Brick; Alan Stein (9 August 2011). "Mental health of displaced and refugee children resettled in high-income countries: risk and protective factors". The Lancet. 379 (9812): 266–282. doi:10.1016/s0140-6736(11)60051-2. ISSN 0140-6736. PMID 21835459. Wikidata Q37915756.
- Mina Fazel; Kimberly Hoagwood; Sharon Stephan; Tamsin Ford (1 October 2014). "Mental health interventions in schools 1: Mental health interventions in schools in high-income countries". The Lancet Psychiatry. 1 (5): 377–387. doi:10.1016/s2215-0366(14)70312-8. ISSN 2215-0366. PMC 4477835. PMID 26114092. Wikidata Q35771354.
- Mina Fazel; Emma Soneson (2023). "Current evidence and opportunities in child and adolescent public mental health: a research review". Journal of Child Psychology and Psychiatry. 64 (12): 1699–1719. doi:10.1111/jcpp.13889.
