= Consideration of future consequences =

Personality trait

The consideration of future consequences (CFC) is a personality trait defined as the extent to which individuals consider the potential future outcomes of their current behaviour and the extent to which they are influenced by the imagined outcomes. Individuals who score highly on a measure such as the Consideration of Future Consequences Scale typically focus on the future implications of their behaviour, whereas those low on CFC typically focus more on their immediate needs and concerns. CFC has been linked with a wide range of theoretically-relevant outcomes.

== Relation to behaviour ==
=== Health ===
Positive and negative consequences

CFC has been shown to have implications for health-related behaviours, as those performed to protect health typically involve delayed benefits and immediate costs. Individuals who ignore the future consequences of their behaviour will tend to focus more on short-term needs and the likelihood of these individuals performing a health-related behaviour depends on their evaluation of the inconvenience, loss of pleasure, or psychological costs of the immediate behaviour. Individuals who think ahead to the future consequences of their present behaviours are more inclined to act in ways that are protective of their future health and well-being.

Varying levels of CFC have been found to be related to smoking and alcohol consumption, where individuals with higher CFC scores report lower frequencies of each behaviour. High CFC individuals have also been shown to be more cautious about their sexual activity, have fewer sexual partners, are more likely to use alternate methods of reducing exposure to HIV (e.g. inquiring about partner's sexual history, delaying or abstaining from sex), and are more likely to seek out HIV-testing. People high in CFC have also been found to have more regular sleep schedules. Conversely, low CFC has been shown to be associated with higher Body Mass Index.

Considering the future implications of one's behavior is also important when making decisions regarding treatment options for health problems. For example, increasing evidence suggests that long-term estrogen therapy raises the risk of breast cancer, drugs used to reduce stomach acid have been linked to numerous future health problems, and long-term blood pressure medication use can cause a number of side effects. The immediate benefits of certain treatments may be positive in the short-term, but the long-term risks associated with these treatments can lead to health issues in the future.

=== Academic achievement ===
Individuals high in CFC have been shown to have higher grade point averages in college. CFC scale scores were found to be positively correlated with grade point average and also predicted success and goal attainment among students. Furthermore, one study investigated students' self-reported procrastination and self-regulation in relation to CFC and achievement goals. Results indicated that CFC was positively associated with self-regulation and negatively associated with procrastination, showing that students higher in CFC were less likely to procrastinate.

=== Aggression ===
Measures of aggression have been found to be associated with lower levels of CFC. Joireman, Anderson, and Strathman demonstrated that relative to individuals scoring low on CFC, those scoring high were found to be less aggressive only when aggression was likely to carry future costs. CFC also plays a role in aggressive driving. Lower CFC scores have been shown to be associated with aggressive and risky driving behaviour, physically aggressive expression (e.g. shaking a fist at another driver), using one's vehicle to express anger, and are shown to be negatively related to constructive expression (thinking the situation through before responding). Individuals with higher CFC report engaging in fewer aggressive and risky driving behaviours and are more likely to express driving-related anger in an appropriate manner.

=== Fiscal responsibility ===
Studies have examined whether CFC has implications in the way people handle their money, specifically financial behavior that maximizes long-term well being (fiscal responsibility). Participants in these studies were measured on their tendencies to shop impulsively and whether they were more likely to choose between a lower amount of money in the short-term over a larger amount of money in the future, a concept referred to as temporal discounting. Results showed that individuals with low levels of CFC had greater impulsive buying tendencies and were more likely to engage in temporal discounting. Additionally, another study among college students found that more compulsive buyers who focused on maximizing immediate consequences were at a much greater risk of building up significant amounts of credit card debt.

=== Environmentalism ===
CFC has been shown to be associated with pro-environmentalism. Research has found that pro-environmental intentions and behaviours are predicted by individual differences in CFC, for example, CFC has been shown to influence recycling behaviour. Furthermore, in a study with a sample of commuters, preferences for using public transportation as opposed to driving a car were influenced by CFC levels, specifically when individuals believed that excessive car usage could damage air quality.

== Measurement ==
Consideration of future consequences is measured by the Consideration of Future Consequences Scale developed by Strathman and colleagues, and consists of 12 items. Respondents are asked to indicate to what extent each item characterizes them on a 5-point Likert scale ranging from 1 (extremely uncharacteristic) to 5 (extremely characteristic). Example items are as follows: "I often consider how things might be in the future and try to influence those things with my day to day behaviour," "I only act to satisfy immediate concerns, figuring the future will take care of itself," and "I think that sacrificing now is usually unnecessary since future outcomes can be dealt with at a later time." The scale has been translated into ten different languages: Chinese, Dutch, English, French, German, Hebrew, Portuguese, Romanian, Spanish, and Turkish.

In relation to other similar constructs, the CFC scale has demonstrated good convergent validity. Measures of internal locus of control, delay of gratification, and the future oriented items on the Stanford Time Perspective Inventory, have all been found to be positively correlated with CFC.

The CFC scale has also shown good incremental validity. Strathman and colleagues measured the amount of variance predicted by CFC over and above the effects of other similar variables. Results showed that CFC predicted health behaviours, such as smoking and environmental behaviours, over and above the variables of conscientiousness, hope, optimism, and time perspective.

=== Age differences ===
CFC is relatively stable on a one-year timeline, however it has been shown to be less stable over three years. Research has suggested that individual levels of CFC may decline with age. Such findings can be examined by looking at differences in average CFC scores across various age groups. Mean CFC scores obtained in previous studies have ranged from 4.84 among undergraduates, 3.87 among commuters with an average age of 38 years, and 3.20 among a sample of 50- to 69-year-olds.

== Health communication ==
=== Temporal framing ===
A message framing technique known as temporal framing has been used to examine the impact of CFC on persuasive messages regarding various behaviours. The temporal frame allows the expected outcomes of a behaviour (benefits and losses) to be presented as occurring in the short-term or in the long-term. This technique allows for researchers to implement two different frames: one with the negative consequences presented as short-term and the positive consequences presented as long-term. In the opposite time frame, the positive consequences are presented as short-term and the negative consequences as long-term.

Studies have shown that high CFC individuals indicate greater intentions to engage in healthy behavior when the long-term consequences are positive and the short-term consequences are negative, whereas low CFC individuals indicate greater intentions when presented with the opposite frame. These findings have been shown with messages promoting colorectal cancer screening, type 2 diabetes screening, and sunscreen use.

=== Gain and loss framing ===
Research has also used gain and loss-framed messages to investigate how to effectively prevent future health problems. Gain-framed messages emphasize what one has to gain by performing a behaviour and loss-framed messages emphasize what one has to lose by not performing a behaviour. O'Connor, Warttig, Conner, and Lawton examined the effectiveness of a web-based intervention aimed at raising awareness of the risks associated with hypertension. The researchers examined the role of CFC in influencing the success of this intervention. High and low CFC participants were presented with either a gain-framed message or a loss-framed message and then were provided with health information about hypertension to read afterwards. Results indicated a loss frame advantage for participants high in CFC and a gain frame advantage for those low in CFC. Furthermore, high CFC participants spent almost twice as long as low CFC participants in reading the health information that was provided.

== Scale limitations and criticisms ==
=== Readability ===
The CFC scale has been tested for its level of readability, an assessment measured by the number of years of education needed to understand the text in the scale. One study examined the readability and reliability of the CFC scale and another measure of time orientation, the Zimbardo Time Perspective Inventory (ZTPI). Results showed that although the CFC scale showed greater reliability than the ZTPI, it had poorer readability, indicating that it may be more difficult to understand. For example, in one study participants found some items on the CFC scale difficult to understand and reported that having them explained and contextualized helped in understanding them better.

=== Number of scale items ===
It has been suggested that the 12-item CFC scale is unstable and that it may be more appropriate to use an 8-item scale when measuring the CFC construct. One study, which conducted an exploratory factor analysis on the original 12-item CFC scale, revealed that the scale generated two different factors. Little support was found for the stability of the second factor, which attained poor internal consistency. A confirmatory factor analysis showed that an 8-item scale, representing Factor 1, fit considerably better than did any model that included Factor 2, thus suggesting that a shortened version of the scale should be implemented (for recent development of brief scales, see below).

CFC-14 Scale

In 2012, the CFC scale was expanded to 14 items with 7 items measuring consideration of future consequences and 7 items measuring consideration of immediate consequences. Exploratory and confirmatory factor analyses supported a two-factor structure of the so-called "CFC-14" scale.

Brief and Very Brief CFC Scales

The CFC-Future and CFC-Immediate subscales both showed good internal reliability. Most recently, working from the CFC-14, highly reliable short (6-item) and very short (4-item) scales were developed that retain the distinction between CFC-Future and CFC-Immediate subscales.
