= Black & Lane's Ident Tones for Surround =

Set of television sound test tones

BLITS_5.1Lineup_Demonstration.ogg
A demonstration of the BLITS tone sequence according to EBU 3304 (Not in 5.1 surround for technical reasons)

Black & Lane's Ident Tones for Surround (BLITS) is a way of keeping track of channels in a mixed surround-sound, stereo, and mono world. It was developed by Martin Black and Keith Lane of Sky TV London in 2004. BLITS is used by Sky, the BBC and other European and US broadcasters to identify and lineup 5.1 broadcast circuits. It is also an EBU standard: EBU Tech 3304. It is designed to function as a 5.1 identification and phase-checking signal and to be meaningful in stereo when an automated downmix to stereo is employed.

BLITS is a set of tones designed for television 5.1 sound line-up. It consists of three distinct sections.

The first section is made up from short tones at -18 dBfs to identify each channel individually:

Ø L/R: Front LEFT and Front RIGHT – 880 Hz

Ø C: CENTRE – 1320 Hz

Ø Lfe: (Low Frequency Effects) – 82.5 Hz

Ø Ls/Rs: Surround LEFT and Surround RIGHT – 660 Hz.

The second section identifies front left and right channels (L/R) only:

1 kHz tone at -18 dBfs is interrupted four times on the left channel and is continuous on the right. This pattern of interrupts has been chosen to prevent confusion with either the EBU stereo ident or BBC GLITS tone after stereo mix down.

The last section consists of 2 kHz tone at -24dBFS on all six channels. This can be used to check phase between any of the 5.1 legs.

When the tone is summed to stereo using default down-mix values this section should produce tones of approximately -18 dBfs on each channel. The BLITS sequence repeats approximately every 14 seconds.

== See also ==
- GLITS
