= Strengths and Difficulties Questionnaire =

- LOINC: 62713-3

The Strengths and Difficulties Questionnaire (SDQ) is a screening questionnaire for emotional and behavioral problems in children and adolescents ages 2 through 17 years old, developed by child psychiatrist Robert N. Goodman in the United Kingdom. The questionnaire is quite brief with 25 questions and, depending on the version, a few questions about how the child is affected by the difficulties in their everyday life. Versions of it are available for use for no fee. The combination of its brevity and noncommercial distribution have made it popular among clinicians and researchers. Overall, the SDQ has proved to have satisfactory construct and concurrent validity across a wide range of settings and samples. It is considered a good general screening measure for attention problems, although the sensitivity and specificity are not both over .80 at any single cut score, so it should not be used by itself as the basis for a diagnosis of attention-deficit/hyperactivity disorder.

There are three versions of the SDQ designed for use in different situations: a short form, a longer form with an impact supplement, and a follow-up form designed for use after a behavioral intervention. The questionnaire takes 3–10 minutes to complete. There are now self-report (completed by the youth), parent-report, and teacher-report versions. A version designed for adults (age 18+ years) to fill out about themselves has also been developed. The SDQ has been translated into more than 80 languages, including Spanish, Chinese, Russian, and Portuguese.

General population norms are available for the US and UK for some of the variations of the SDQ. There are also Swedish norms developed for children age 3-5 years.
