= Validation =

Validation may refer to:

- Data validation, in computer science, ensuring that data inserted into an application satisfies defined formats and other input criteria
- Emotional validation, in interpersonal communication is the recognition, the affirmation, the acceptance of the existence of expressed emotions, and the communication, the acknowledgement, of this recognition with the emoter(s) (the one(s) who express the emotions).
- Forecast verification, validating and verifying prognostic output from a numerical model
- Regression validation, in statistics, determining whether the outputs of a regression model are adequate
- Social validation, compliance in a social activity to fit in and be part of the majority
- Statistical model validation, determining whether the outputs of a statistical model are acceptable
- Validation (drug manufacture), documenting that a process or system meets its predetermined specifications and quality attributes
- Validation (gang membership), a formal process for designating a criminal as a member of a gang
- Validation of foreign studies and degrees, processes for transferring educational credentials between countries
- Validation therapy, a therapy developed by Naomi Feil for older people with cognitive impairments and dementia
- Verification and validation (software), checking that software meets specifications and fulfills its intended purpose
- Verification and validation, in engineering, confirming that a product or service meets the needs of its users
- XML validation, the process of checking a document written in XML to confirm that it both is "well-formed" and follows a defined structure

== See also ==
- Cross validation (disambiguation)
- Revalidation, of medical doctors in UK
- Triangulation (social science)
- Validity (disambiguation)
- Verification (disambiguation)
