= Robert Goodman (psychiatrist) =

British child psychiatrist (1953–2025)

- Born: Robert Nicholas Goodman; 15 November 1953; London, England
- Died: 18 December 2025 (aged 72)
- Occupation: Psychiatrist
- Writing career
- Language: English
- Subject: Child psychiatry
- Notable works: SDQ, DAWBA

Robert Nicholas Goodman (15 November 1953 – 18 December 2025) was a British child psychiatrist who was Professor of Brain and Behavioural Medicine at the Institute of Psychiatry in the Department of Child and Adolescent Psychiatry, King's College London. He specialised in hemiplegia and online psychiatric screening. Goodman was a member of the Royal College of Physicians, and was awarded a Fellowship of the Royal College of Psychiatrists in 1987.

Goodman was the primary inventor of the SDQ Strengths and Difficulties Questionnaire and the Development And Wellbeing Assessment or DAWBA.

Goodman died from complications of dementia on 18 December 2025, aged 72.
