= Combined Forces Command =

Combined Forces Command may refer to:

- ROK/US Combined Forces Command in South Korea since 1978
- Combined Forces Command-Afghanistan 2001–7
