= Valid S.A. =

Valid Soluções S.A.
- Company type: Sociedade Anônima
- Traded as: B3: VLID3
- Industry: Technology
- Founded: 1957
- Headquarters: São Paulo, Brazil
- Key people: Ilson Bressan (CEO)
- Products: Smart cards, Mobile, Driver's license Data solutions, Identity cards, IoT Payment Solutions and others
- Revenue: ▲ R$ 2 Billion (2022)
- Number of employees: 3,500

Valid S.A. is a Brazilian engraving company headquartered in São Paulo that provides security printing services to financial institutions, telecommunication companies, state governments, and public agencies in Brazil, Argentina, and Spain.

In total there are 3 factories and 84 "personalization sites". In 2010, sales totaled 465.1 million cards, 15.4 million driver's licenses and identity cards and 12.3 thousand tons of paper.

== History ==
The company was founded in 1957 in Brazil as an American Banknote's subsidiary. In 2006 the company made its initial public offering in BM&F Bovespa and changed its name to Valid in October 2010.

== Customers ==
The Valid offers its services to large companies and government institutions, its main customers are telecommunications companies Telefônica Brasil, TIM and Claro Brasil, banks as Itaú Unibanco, Banco do Brasil, Citibank, Bradesco, Santander Brasil and Caixa Economica Federal, as well as the BM&F Bovespa and the Brazilian Department of Transit.
