= GLITS =

Television sound test tone

"GLITS test signal"
A 2 minute audio demonstration of the GLITS test signal, constructed in Audacity using instruction from this page.

Graham's Line Identification Tone System (GLITS) is a test signal for stereo systems devised by BBC TV Sound Supervisor and Fellow of the IPS Graham Haines in the mid-1980s. It comprises a 1 kHz tone at 0 dBu (-18 dBFS) on both channels, with interruptions which identify the channels.

The left channel is interrupted once for 250 ms every 4 seconds. 250 ms later the right channel has two interruptions of 250 ms spaced by 250 ms.

This arrangement has an advantage over the EBU stereo ident tone in that each channel is explicitly identified as belonging to a stereo pair. The EBU Technical Document Multichannel Audio Line-up Tone (Tech 3304) defines stereo lineup tone as having an interruption in the left channel only, lasting 250 ms every 3 s.

== Multichannel GLITS ==
There is now an official EBU standard for a multichannel BLITS 5.1 channel ident tone which is also described in the Tech 3304 paper, along with an alternative film-style multichannel ident tone system for systems larger than 5.1 arrays.

Blits plays a sequence of tones (based on the musical notes A and E) at -18dBFS on each channel in the AES channel format order (L, R, C, LFE, Ls, Rs), followed by an EBU-style ident on just the front left and right channels, again at -18dBFS and with four interruptions on the left channel. The four interruptions provides a unique confirmation that the stereo or mono downmix came from a 5.1 source and avoids any possible confusion with stereo EBU or GLITS downmixes. The final BLITS tone sequence is a 2 kHz tone at -24dBFS on all six channels – the lower source signal level ensuring that any derived downmixes remain close to -18dBFS.

The alternative EBU multichannel ident tone follows a format more closely associated with the film industry. A sustained 80 Hz runs on the LFE channel throughout the sequence. After a 3-second period of constant 1 kHz, -18dBFS tone on all main channels, each channel is identified in turn with a 0.5s pulse of 1 kHz tone, separated from its neighbours by 0.5s silence. The ident sequence starts at Front Left and continues clockwise through each available channel. The amount of time between the 3 second constant tone periods indicates the total number of channels in the system—e.g. a 7.1 system will have an ident sequence lasting 8 seconds.

Snell & Wilcox have used the following on the embedded audio in their VALID8 (Video Audio Line-up & IDentification) equipment:

- Channel 1 (L) 980 Hz one 250 ms interruption every 4 seconds
- Channel 2 (R) 980 Hz two 250 ms interruptions every 4 seconds
- Channel 3 (C) 432 Hz one 250 ms interruption every 4 seconds
- Channel 4 (Lfe) 432 Hz two 250 ms interruptions every 4 seconds (probably not audible from a subwoofer)
- Channel 5 (Ls) 990 Hz one 250 ms interruption every 4 seconds
- Channel 6 (Rs) 990 Hz two 250 ms interruptions every 4 seconds
- Channel 7 (Lo) 436 Hz one 250 ms interruption every 4 seconds
- Channel 8 (Ro) 436 Hz two 250 ms interruptions every 4 seconds
