= Convergent validity =

Methodological parameter in the social sciences

Convergent validity in the behavioral sciences refers to the degree to which two measures that theoretically should be related, are in fact related. Convergent validity, along with discriminant validity, is a subtype of construct validity. Convergent validity can be established if two similar constructs correspond with one another, while discriminant validity applies to two dissimilar constructs that are easily differentiated.

Campbell and Fiske (1959) developed the Multitrait-Multimethod Matrix to assess the construct validity of a set of measures in a study. The approach stresses the importance of using both discriminant and convergent validation techniques when assessing new tests. In other words, in order to establish construct validity, you have to demonstrate both convergence and discrimination.

== Evaluation / application ==
To assess the extent of convergent validity, a test of a construct is correlated with other tests designed to measure theoretically similar constructs. For instance, to assess the convergent validity of a test of mathematics skills, the scores on the test are correlated with scores on other tests that are also designed to measure basic mathematics ability. High correlations between the test scores would be evidence of convergent validity.

Convergent evidence is best interpreted in conjunction with discriminant evidence. That is, patterns of intercorrelations between two dissimilar measures should be low while correlations with similar measures should be substantially greater. This evidence can be organized as a multitrait-multimethod matrix. For example, in order to test the convergent validity of a measure of self-esteem, a researcher may want to show that measures of similar constructs, such as self-worth, confidence, social skills, and self-appraisal are also related to self-esteem, whereas non-overlapping factors, such as intelligence, should not relate.

== See also ==
- Construct validity
- Content validity
- Criterion validity
- Discriminant validity (divergent validity)
- Face validity
- Test validity
- Validity (statistics)
