= Citizens for Conservation =

Citizens for Conservation, Inc.
- Formation: 1971
- Type: Non-profit organization
- Purpose: Restoration and protection of native species and open space
- Headquarters: Barrington, IL
- Region served: USA
- President: Kathleen Leitner
- Main organ: Board of Directors
- Website: www.CitizensForConservation.org

Citizens for Conservation (commonly called CFC) is a nonprofit organization, centered in Barrington, Illinois, established in 1971. CFC's motto is Saving Living Space for Living Things through protection, restoration and stewardship of land, conservation of natural resources and education. It is a member of Chicago Wilderness and the Land Trust Alliance.

CFC specializes in habitat restoration, both on properties it owns and nearby forest preserves of Lake County Forest Preserve District and Forest Preserve District of Cook County. CFC relies almost entirely on volunteers, meeting at least once a week year-round. In addition, student interns are hired during the summer.

CFC received the 2011 Conservation and Native Landscaping award from the U.S. EPA and Chicago Wilderness for its restoration work on the Flint Creek Savanna, their largest property and location of their headquarters.

== CFC properties ==
As of early 2020, CFC owned 12 properties for a total of 476 acres. Much of this is agricultural land that was donated or purchased, and restored back to natural habitat, primarily oak savanna, tallgrass prairie, and wetlands. Removal of invasive species and re-seeding of native species from local seed sources is the main focus of habitat restoration. It has the largest holding of fee simple lands (direct ownership) of any non-profit in Lake County, Illinois.

In August of 2022, CFC announced the purchase of the 246 acre Hill 'N Dale Farm, previously owned by the Duchossois family. This was funded in part by a large grant from the Illinois Clean Energy Community Foundation. By 2025, CFC owned 732 acres across 14 preserves.

== Education ==
CFC offers periodic programs for children as part of the No Child Left Inside project, and works with the local school district to introduce 3rd and 4th graders to the prairie. It also provides occasional community education programs for adults.
