= Cross-validation =

Cross-validation may refer to:

- Cross-validation (statistics), a technique for estimating the performance of a predictive model
- Cross-validation (analytical chemistry), the practice of confirming an experimental finding by repeating the experiment using an independent assay technique

== See also ==
- Validation (disambiguation)
