= Samuel Messick =

American educational psychologist (1931–1998)

- Born: Samuel James Messick III; April 3, 1931; Philadelphia, Pennsylvania, U.S.
- Died: October 6, 1998 (aged 67); Philadelphia, Pennsylvania, U.S.
- Occupation: Psychologist
- Awards: E. L. Thorndike Award (1993)

Academic background
- Education: University of Pennsylvania; Princeton University
- Thesis: The perception of attitude relationships: a multidimensional scaling approach to the structuring of social attitudes (1954)
- Doctoral advisor: Harold Gulliksen

Samuel James Messick III (April 3, 1931 – October 6, 1998) was an American psychologist who worked for the Educational Testing Service (ETS), known for his contributions to validity theory.

== Early life ==
Messick was born in Philadelphia. He graduated from the University of Pennsylvania, where he earned a bachelor's degree, and he earned a PhD under the supervision of Harold Gulliksen from Princeton University in 1954. He conducted research as a postdoctoral fellow at the University of Illinois Urbana-Champaign until 1955.

== Career ==
From 1956 till his retirement, Messick worked as a psychologist for the Educational Testing Service (ETS). He examined construct validity. Messick influenced language testing in 2 main ways: in proposing a new understanding of how inferences made based on tests must be challenged, and in drawing attention to the consequences of test use.

== Death and legacy ==
Messick resided in Pennington, New Jersey. He died on October 6, 1998, in Philadelphia, at 67.

The Quantitative and Qualitative Methods division (Division 5) of the American Psychological Association created the Samuel J. Messick Distinguished Scientific Contributions Award to honor Messick's contributions. Douglas N. Jackson, a previous collaborator of Messick, earned the award in 2004.

== Works ==
- (ed. with Harold Gulliksen) Psychological scaling: theory and applications; report of a conference. New York: Wiley, 1960.
- (ed. with John Ross) Measurement in personality and cognition. New York: Wiley, 1962.
- (ed. with Silvan Tomkins) Computer simulation of personality: frontier of psychological theory, New York: Wiley, 1963.
- (ed. with Arthur H. Brayfield) Decision and choice; contributions of Sidney Siegel. New York: McGraw-Hill, 1964.
- (ed. with Douglas N. Jackson) Problems in human assessment. New York: McGraw-Hill, 1967.
- (ed.) Individuality in learning. San Francisco: Jossey-Bass Publishers, 1976.
- (ed.) Validity. In R. L. Linn (Ed.) Educational Measurement (3rd ed., pp. 13–103). New York: Macmillan, 1989.
