= Concurrent validity =

Concurrent validity is a type of evidence that can be gathered to defend the use of a test for predicting other outcomes. It is a parameter used in sociology, psychology, and other psychometric or behavioral sciences. Concurrent validity is demonstrated when a test correlates well with a measure that has previously been validated. The two measures may be for the same construct, but more often used for different, but presumably related, constructs.

The two measures in the study are taken at the same time. This is in contrast to predictive validity, where one measure occurs earlier and is meant to predict some later measure. In both cases, the (concurrent) predictive power of the test is analyzed using a simple correlation or linear regression.

== Alignment with classical conceptions of validity ==
Concurrent validity and predictive validity are two types of criterion-related validity. The difference between concurrent validity and predictive validity rests solely on the time at which the two measures are administered. Concurrent validity applies to validation studies in which the two measures are administered at approximately the same time. For example, an employment test may be administered to a group of workers and then the test scores can be correlated with the ratings of the workers' supervisors taken on the same day or in the same week. The resulting correlation would be a concurrent validity coefficient. This type of evidence might be used to support the use of the employment test for future selection of employees.

Concurrent validity may be used as a practical substitute for predictive validity. In the example above, predictive validity would be the best choice for validating an employment test, because using the employment test on existing employees may not be a strong analog for using the tests for selection. Reduced motivation and restriction of range are just two possible biasing effects for concurrent validity studies.

== Contrasting similar terms ==
Concurrent validity differs from convergent validity in that it focuses on the power of the focal test to predict outcomes on another test or some outcome variable. Convergent validity refers to the observation of strong correlations between two tests that are assumed to measure the same construct. It is the interpretation of the focal test as a predictor that differentiates this type of evidence from convergent validity, though both methods rely on simple correlations in the statistical analysis.

== See also ==
- Construct validity
- Discriminant validity
