= Criterion validity =

Validity within a criteria

In psychometrics, criterion validity, or criterion-related validity, is the extent to which an operationalization of a construct, such as a test, relates to, or predicts, a theoretically related behaviour or outcome — the criterion. Criterion validity is often divided into concurrent and predictive validity based on the timing of measurement for the "predictor" and outcome. Concurrent validity refers to a comparison between the measure in question and an outcome assessed at the same time. Standards for Educational & Psychological Tests states, "concurrent validity reflects only the status quo at a particular time." Predictive validity, on the other hand, compares the measure in question with an outcome assessed at a later time. Although concurrent and predictive validity are similar, it is cautioned to keep the terms and findings separated. "Concurrent validity should not be used as a substitute for predictive validity without an appropriate supporting rationale." Criterion validity is typically assessed by comparison with a gold standard test.

An example of concurrent validity is a comparison of the scores of the CLEP College Algebra exam with course grades in college algebra to determine the degree to which scores on the CLEP are related to performance in a college algebra class. An example of predictive validity is a comparison of scores on the SAT with first semester grade point average (GPA) in college; this assesses the degree to which SAT scores are predictive of college performance.

== See also ==
- Construct validity
- Content validity
- Discriminant validity (divergent validity)
- Face validity
- Test validity
- Validity (statistics)
