= Psychometric software =

Software used for psychometric analysis

Psychometric software refers to specialized programs used for the psychometric analysis of data obtained from tests, questionnaires, polls or inventories that measure latent psychoeducational variables. Although some psychometric analyses can be performed using general statistical software such as SPSS, most require specialized tools designed specifically for psychometric purposes.

== Sources of Free Software ==
Numerous free psychometric tools have been developed by researchers and educators. Notable websites and resources offering such software include:

- CASMA at the University of Iowa, USA: Hosts the GENOVA Suite of computer programs for generalizability theory.
- Software from Harold Doran, PACER: Provides web-based and desktop applications for psychometric analysis.
- REMP at the University of Massachusetts, USA: Provides item response theory software, with the last update in 2008.
- Software from Brad Hanson: Offers C++ libraries for item response theory (IRT).
- Software from John Uebersax: Features latent class analysis software.
- Software from J. Patrick Meyer, jMetrik: Provides open-source software for psychometric analysis.
- Software from PMaps: Specializes in psychometric assessment software.
- Software directory at the Institute for Objective Measurement: Lists various psychometric
- Software from Matthew Courtney, Kevin Chang, Eric Mei, Kane Meissel, Luke Rowe, and Laila Issayeva.

There is also an R Shiny tool for reproducible Rasch analysis, differential item functioning, equating, and examination of group effects.

Additionally, an increasing number of packages for R can be found in the CRAN Task View: Psychometric Models and Methods.

== Classical test theory ==
Classical test theory (CTT) is an approach to psychometric analysis that involves fewer assumptions than item response theory and is more suitable for smaller sample sizes.

=== Autopsych ===
Autopsych is a free and open-source web app with multiple features for conducting Classical Test Theory (CTT) and Rasch modeling. CTT functions include:

- Percentage correct
- Observed scores for each item category
- Item-total correlations
- Item-rest correlations (with user-specified confidence intervals)
- Item-rest point biserial/polyserial correlations
- Cronbach’s alpha
- Alpha-if-deleted
- Full Pearson correlation matrix (item matrix) with levels of statistical significance

Autopsych also performs several Rasch-based functions, including:

- Basic Rasch many-facets analysis for differential item functioning (DIF)
- Fixed item equating for dichotomous item-response matrices
- One-way ANOVA
- Inter-rater reliability analysis

=== CITAS ===
CITAS (Classical Item and Test Analysis Spreadsheet) is a free Excel workbook designed to provide scoring and statistical analysis of classroom tests. Users can type or paste item responses (ABCD) and keys into the workbook, and the output is automatically populated. Unlike some other programs, CITAS does not require any 'running' or experience in psychometric analysis, making it accessible to teachers and professors.

=== jMetrik ===
jMetrik is free and open-source software for conducting comprehensive psychometric analysis, developed by J. Patrick Meyer at the University of Virginia. It includes methods for:

- Classical item analysis
- Differential item functioning (DIF) analysis
- Confirmatory factor analysis
- Item response theory (IRT)
- IRT equating
- Nonparametric item response theory

jMetrik's item analysis includes proportion, point biserial, and biserial statistics for all response options. It calculates various reliability coefficients include Cronbach's alpha, Guttman's lambda and the Feldt-Gilmer Coefficient. The DIF analysis uses nonparametric item characteristic curves and the Mantel-Haenszel procedure, reporting effect sizes and ETS DIF classifications. IRT methods include the Rasch, partial credit, and rating scale models, with equating methods like mean/mean, mean/sigma, Haebara, and Stocking-Lord procedures.

jMetrik also features:

- IRT illustrator
- Basic descriptive statistics
- Graphics facility for bar charts, pie charts, histograms, kernel density estimates, and line plots

jMetrik is a pure Java application that runs on 32-bit and 64-bit versions of Windows, Mac, and Linux operating systems, requires Java 1.6 on the host computer.

=== Iteman ===
Iteman is a commercial Windows program specifically designed for classical test analysis. It produces tech reports in Microsoft Word with graphics, narratives, and embedded tables. Iteman calculates the proportion and point biserial of each item, high/low subgroup proportions, and detailed item performance graphics. It also provides descriptive statistics, including the mean, standard deviation, reliability, and standard error of measurement, for each domain and the overall tests. Iteman is available from Assessment Systems Corporation.

=== Lertap ===
Lertap5 (Laboratory of Educational Research Test Analysis Program) is a comprehensive software package for test and survey analyses, developed for Windows and Macintosh computers with Microsoft Excel. Lertap5 includes:

- Test, item and option statistics
- Classification consistency and mastery test analysis
- Cheating detection procedures
- Extensive graphics (e.g., trace lines for item options, conditional standard errors of measurement, scree plots, boxplots, histograms, scatterplots)

Lertap5 supports both CTT and Rasch item analysis for dichotomous test items. DIF (differential item functioning) is supported using Mantel-Haenszel methods, with graphical results. It also interfaces with R and R Studio, producing data and control files for various IRT programs like Xcalibre and Bilog MG, and preparing data for SAS.

Lertap5 was developed by Larry Nelson at Curtin University and is available from Lertap5.com.

=== TAP ===
TAP (Test Analysis Program) is a free Windows program written in Delphi Pascal that performs test and item analyses based on classical test theory. TAP provides reports on examinee total scores, item statistics (e.g., item difficulty, item discrimination, point-biserial), options analyses, and other useful information. It also provides individual examinee reports of total scores and item responses.

=== ViSta-CITA ===
ViSta-CITA (Classical Item and Test Analysis) is a module within the Visual Statistics System (ViSta) that applies graphical-oriented methods to psychometric analysis. Developed by Ruben Ledesma, J. Gabriel Molina, Pedro M. Valero-Mora, and Forrest W. Young. ViSta has not been updated since 2014.

=== Psych ===
Psych is an R package providing routines for personality, psychometrics, and experimental psychology. Its functions support:

- Scale construction using factor analysis, cluster analysis, and reliability analysis
- Basic descriptive statistics
- Item response theory via factor analysis of tetrachoric and polychoric correlations
- Simulating item and test structures
- Structural equation modelling

Psych creates graphical displays of path diagrams, factor analysis, and structural equation models using basic graphics. For more information, see the personality-project.org/r webpage.

== Item response theory calibration ==
Item response theory (IRT) is a psychometric approach which assumes that the probability of a certain response is a direct function of an underlying trait or traits. Various functions have been proposed to model this relationship, and the different calibration packages reflect this. Several software packages have been developed for additional analysis such as equating; they are listed in the next section.

=== Autopsych ===
An open-source software program, Autopsych, is used for performing uni-dimensional Rasch analysis. The app can handle both dichotomous and polytomous data via the application of master’s partial credit model. The app adopts marginal maximum likelihood estimation and leverages off a total 31 open-source R packages (including TAM, psych, knitr, etc.). Users upload item-response matrices (.csv files), customize settings for Rasch analysis, and the app automatically generates PDF with embedded narration for methodology and results. Excel files include outputs for all analyses performed including plausible values. Users can also perform basic many-facets Rasch analysis for an examination of item DIF, fixed anchor equating for two dichotomous matrices, an analysis of variance (ANOVA) of EAP theta estimates for examining the effect of group effects, and inter-rater reliability analysis for the examination of examiner consistency. A full exposition of the web app is provided in the journal, PLOS ONE SCIENCE.

=== BILOG-MG ===
BILOG-MG is a software program for IRT analysis of dichotomous (correct/incorrect) data, including fit and differential item functioning. It is commercial, and only available from Scientific Software International.

=== Dexter ===
Dexter, first published February 2017, is an R package intended as a robust and fairly comprehensive system for managing and analyzing test data organized in booklets. The package includes facilities for importing and managing test data, assessing and improving the quality of data through basic test-and-item analysis, fitting an IRT model, and computing various estimates of ability. Many psychometric methods not found elsewhere are provided, such as Haberman’s (2007) interaction model generalized for polytomous items, efficient generation of plausible values or scores, new methods for exploratory and confirmatory DIF analysis, support for the 3DC method of standard setting, and many more. The central IRT model is a polytomous generalization of the extended marginal Rasch model. Estimation is by CML or Bayesian techniques. There are two companion packages: dextergui, first published June 2018, and providing an easy graphical interface to the most widely used functions in dexter; and dexterMST, first published July 2018, for managing and analysing data from multi-stage test designs. All packages are extensively documented both for the beginner as for the professional

=== Facets ===
Facets is a software program for Rasch analysis of rates or judge-intermediated data, such as essay grades, diving competitions, satisfaction surveys and quality-of-life data. Other applications include rank-order data, binomial trials and Poisson counts.

=== FlexMIRT ===
FlexMIRT IRT software is a multilevel, multiple group software package for item analysis, item calibration, and test scoring. The flexMIRT IRT software package fits a variety of unidimensional and multidimensional item response theory models (also known as item factor analysis models) to single-level and multilevel data in any number of groups.

=== Irtoys ===
Irtoys is an R package first published in 2007 and supporting almost everything in the book but limited to one booklet of dichotomous items. It is good for teaching, smaller projects, as a psychometrician's Swiss knife and as a source of building stones for other projects. The simple syntax files for ICL and BILOG-MG it writes can be studied and modified to handle more complicated problems.

=== ICL ===
ICL (IRT Command Language) performs IRT calibrations, including the 1, 2, and 3 parameter logistic models as well as the partial credit model and generalized partial credit model. It can also generate response data. As the name implies, it is completely command code driven, with no graphical user interface.

=== jMetrik ===
jMetrik is a free and open source software for conducting a comprehensive psychometric analysis. It was developed by J. Patrick Meyer at the University of Virginia. Current methods include classical item analysis, differential item functioning (DIF) analysis, item response theory, IRT equating, and nonparametric item response theory. The item analysis includes proportion, point biserial, and biserial statistics for all response options. Reliability coefficients include Cronbach's alpha, Guttman's lambda, the Feldt-Gilmer Coefficient, the Feldt-Brennan coefficient, decision consistency indices, the conditional standard error of measurement, and reliability if item deleted. The DIF analysis is based on nonparametric item characteristic curves and the Mantel-Haenszel procedure. DIF effect sizes and ETS DIF classifications are included in the output. IRT methods include the Rasch, partial credit, and rating scale models estimated via JMLE. jMetrik also provides the 3PL, 4PL, and generalized partial credit models estimated via MMLE. Person scoring methods include MLE, MAP, and EAP. IRT equating methods include mean/mean, mean/sigma, Haebara, and Stocking-Lord procedures.

jMetrik also include basic descriptive statistics and a graphics facility that produces bar charts, pie chart, histograms, kernel density estimates, and line plots.

jMetrik is a pure Java application that runs on 32-bit and 64-bit versions of Windows, Mac, and Linux operating systems. jMetrik requires Java 1.6 on the host computer.

=== Lertap5 ===
Lertap5 has inbuilt support for Rasch analyses (Lertap5-Rasch), and also provides support for users of Xcalibre, Bilog-MG, the IRT routines in SAS, and "EIRT", the Excel equivalent of the "RIRT" package. Lertap5 runs an Excel "app", as does EIRT.

=== MULTILOG ===
MULTILOG is an extension of BILOG to data with polytomous (multiple) responses. It is commercial, and only available from Scientific Software International.

=== BMIRT ===
BMIRT is a free Java multi-purpose application program that conducts item calibrations and ability estimation in a multidimensional, multi-group item response theory (IRT) model framework; it can fit dichotomous or polytomous models, along with mixed models. It supports both exploratory and confirmatory and for both compensatory and no compensatory MIRT models.

=== PARSCALE ===
PARSCALE is a program designed specifically for polytomous IRT analysis. It is commercial, and only available from Scientific Software International.

=== PARAM-3PL ===
PARAM-3PL is a free program for the calibration of the 3-parameter logistic IRT model. It was developed by Lawrence Rudner at the Education Resources Information Center (ERIC). The latest release was version 0.93 in August 2012.

=== TESTFact ===
Testfact features

- Marginal maximum likelihood (MML) exploratory factor analysis and classical item analysis of binary data
- Computes tetrachoric correlations, principal factor solution, classical item descriptive statistics, fractal tables and plots
- Handles up to 10 factors using numerical quadrature: up to 5 for non-adaptive and up to 10 for adaptive quadrature
- Handles up to 15 factors using Monte Carlo integration techniques
- Varimax (orthogonal) and PROMAX (oblique) rotation of factor loadings
- Handles an important form of confirmatory factor analysis known as "bifactor" analysis: Factor pattern consists of one main factor plus group factors
- Simulation of responses to items based on user specified parameters
- Correction for guessing and not-reached items
- Allows imposition of constraints on item parameter estimates
- Handles omitted and not-presented items
- Detailed online HELP documentation includes syntax and annotated examples.

=== WINMIRA 2001 ===
WINMIRA 2001 is a program for analyses with the Rasch model for dichotomous and polytomous ordinal responses, with the latent class analysis, and with the Mixture Distribution Rasch model for dichotomous and polytomous item responses. The software provides conditional maximum likelihood (CML) estimation of item parameters, as well as MLE and WLE estimates of person parameters, and person- and item-fit statistics as well as information criteria (AIC, BIC, CAIC) for model selection. The software also performs a parametric bootstrap procedure for the selection of the number of mixture components. A free student version is available from Matthias von Davier's webpage and a commercial version is available.

=== Winsteps ===
Winsteps is a program designed for analysis with the Rasch model, a one-parameter item response theory model which differs from the 1PL model in that each individual in the person sample is parameterized for item estimation and it is prescriptive and criterion-referenced, rather than descriptive and norm-referenced in nature. It is commercially available from Winsteps, Inc. A previous DOS-based version, BIGSTEPS, is also available.

=== Xcalibre ===
Xcalibre is a commercial program that performs marginal maximum likelihood estimation of both dichotomous (1PL-Rasch, 2PL, 3PL) and all major polytomous IRT models. The interface is point-and-click; no command code required. Its output includes both spreadsheets and a detailed, narrated report document with embedded tables and figures, which can be printed and delivered to subject matter experts for item review. It is only available from Assessment Systems Corporation.

=== IATA ===
IATA is a software package for analysing psychometric and educational assessment data. The interface is point-and-click, and all functionality is delivered through wizard-style interfaces that are based on different workflows or analysis goals, such as pilot testing or equating. IATA reads and writes csv, Excel and SPSS file formats, and produces exportable graphics for all statistical analyses. Each analysis also includes heuristics suggesting appropriate interpretations of the numerical results. IATA performs factor analysis, (1PL-Rasch, 2PL, 3PL) scaling and calibration, differential item functioning (DIF) analysis, (basic) computer aided test development, equating, IRT-based standard setting, score conditioning, and plausible value generation. It is available for free from Polymetrika International.

=== mirt ===
R package. Analysis of discrete response data using unidimensional and multidimensional item analysis models under the Item Response Theory paradigm. Exploratory and confirmatory item factor analysis models are estimated with quadrature (EM) or stochastic (MHRM) methods. Confirmatory bi-factor and two-tier models are available for modeling item testlets using dimension reduction EM algorithms, while multiple group analyses and mixed effects designs are included for detecting differential item, bundle, and test functioning, and for modeling item and person covariates. Finally, latent class models such as the DINA, DINO, multidimensional latent class, mixture IRT models, and zero-inflated response models are supported, as well as a wide family of probabilistic unfolding models.

=== ltm ===
R package. Analysis of multivariate dichotomous and polytomous data using latent trait models under the Item Response Theory approach. It includes the Rasch, the Two-Parameter Logistic, the Birnbaum's Three-Parameter, the Graded Response, and the Generalized Partial Credit Models.

=== TAM ===
R package. The package includes marginal and joint maximum likelihood estimation of uni- and multidimensional item response models (Rasch, 2PL, Generalized Partial Credit, Rating Scale, Multi Facets), fit statistics, standard error estimation, as well as plausible value imputation and weighted likelihood estimation of ability.

=== ACER ConQuest ===
ACER ConQuest is a computer program for fitting both unidimensional and multidimensional item response and latent regression models. It provides data analysis based on a comprehensive and flexible range of item response models (IRM), allowing examination of the properties of performance assessments, traditional assessments and rating scales. ACER ConQuest 4 also offers wider measurement and research community analysis procedures based on the most up-to-date psychometric methods of multifaceted item response models, multidimensional item response models, latent regression models and drawing plausible values.

=== Irtplay ===
R package. Fit unidimensional item response theory (IRT) models to mixture of dichotomous and polytomous data, calibrate online item parameters, estimate examinees' latent abilities, and examine the IRT model-data fit on item-level in different ways as well as provide useful functions related to unidimensional IRT.

=== MIRT ===
A general, open-source program for item-response analysis developed at Educational Testing Service. The program can handle independent variables, multidimensional ability parameters, incomplete data, and complex sampling. Ability variables can be polytomous or multivariate normal, and items can be dichotomous or polytomous.

== Additional item response theory software ==
Because of the complexity of IRT, there exist few software packages capable of calibration. However, many software programs exist for specific ancillary IRT analyses such as equating and scaling. Examples of such software follow.

=== LinkMIRT ===
LinkMIRT is a free Java application program that links two sets of item parameters in a multidimensional IRT (MIRT) framework. The software can implement the Stocking and Lord method, the mean/mean method, and the mean/sigma method. Linking by comment-person and by random equivalent-groups design are supported.

=== PACER ===
PACER is a comprehensive, modern, high-performance psychometric analysis platform designed to support the full lifecycle of assessment development and evaluation. Available as a web application and desktop software for Windows and macOS, PACER provides tools for classical item analysis, unidimensional and multidimensional IRT calibration (including 1PL, 2PL, 3PL, polytomous, multigroup, bifactor, testlet, and correlated-factor models), Bayesian estimation, cognitive diagnostic modeling (G-DINA and variants), differential item functioning (DIF), explanatory IRT, latent regression, plausible values, test scoring, equating, and automated test assembly using advanced mathematical optimization. PACER combines computationally efficient estimation algorithms with an intuitive interface, interactive visualizations, path diagrams, and model diagnostics. It also supports optional AI-assisted psychometric workflows while maintaining independent statistical computation. Built with a focus on flexibility, usability, and data security, PACER accepts standard data formats and offers local, offline processing through its desktop edition.

=== SimuMIRT ===
SimuMIRT is a program that simulates multidimensional data (examinee ability and item responses) for a fixed form (i.e., paper and pencil) test, from a user-specified set of parameters. The rater-effect model is supported.

=== SimuMCAT ===
SimuMCAT is a free Java application program that simulates a multidimensional computer adaptive test (MCAT). The user can select from five different MCAT item selection procedures (Volume, Kullback-Leibler information, Minimize the error variance of the linear combination, Minimum Angle, and Minimize the error variance of the composite score with the optimized weight). Two exposure control approaches are possible: the traditional Sympson-Hetter approach and a maximum exposure control approach. It is also possible to implement content constraints using the Priority Index method. Different stopping rules are implemented with fixed-length test and varying-length test. The user specifies true examinee ability, item pools, and item selection procedures, and the program outputs selected items with item responses and ability estimates. Bayesian and non-Bayesian methods can be specified by the user. The examinees’ ability and item pools can also be created from the program by the user specified distributions.

=== IRTEQ ===
IRTEQ is a freeware Windows GUI application that implements IRT scaling and equating developed by Kyung (Chris) T. Han. It implements IRT scaling/equating methods that are widely used with the “Non-Equivalent Groups Anchor Test” design: Mean/Mean, Mean/Sigma, Robust Mean/Sigma, and TCC methods. For TCC methods, IRTEQ provides the user with the option to choose various score distributions for incorporation into the loss function. IRTEQ supports various popular unidimensional IRT models: Logistic models for dichotomous responses (with 1, 2, or 3 parameters) and the Generalized Partial Credit Model (GPCM) (including Partial Credit Model (PCM), which is a special case of GPCM) and Graded Response Model (GRM) for polytomous responses. IRTEQ can also equate test scores on the scale of a test to the scale of another test using IRT true score equating.

=== ResidPlots-2 ===
ResidPlots-2 is a free program for IRT graphical residual analysis. It was developed by Tie Liang, Kyung (Chris) T. Han, and Ronald K. Hambleton at the University of Massachusetts Amherst.

=== WinGen ===
WinGen is a free Windows-based program that generates IRT parameters and item responses. Kyung (Chris) T. Han at the University of Massachusetts Amherst.

=== ST ===
ST conducts item response theory (IRT) scale transformations for dichotomously scored tests.

=== POLYST ===
POLYST conducts IRT scale transformations for dichotomously and polytomous scored tests.

=== STUIRT ===
STUIRT conducts IRT scale transformations for mixed-format tests (tests that include some multiple-choice items and some polytomous items).

=== Plink ===
R package. This package uses item response theory methods to compute linking constants and conduct chain linking of unidimensional or multidimensional tests for multiple groups under a common item design. The unidimensional methods include the Mean/Mean, Mean/Sigma, Haebara, and Stocking-Lord methods for dichotomous (1PL, 2PL and 3PL) and/or polytomous (graded response, partial credit/generalized partial credit, nominal, and multiple-choice model) items. The multidimensional methods include the least squares method and extensions of the Haebara and Stocking-Lord method using single or multiple dilation parameters for multidimensional extensions of all the unidimensional dichotomous and polytomous item response models. The package also includes functions for importing item and/or ability parameters from common IRT software, conducting IRT true score and observed score equating, and plotting item response curves/surfaces, vector plots, and comparison plots for examining parameter drift.

== Decision consistency ==
Decision consistency methods are applicable to criterion-referenced tests such as licensure exams and academic mastery testing.

=== Iteman ===
Iteman provides an index of decision consistency as well as a classical estimate of the conditional standard error of measurement at the cut score, which is often requested for accreditation of a testing program.

=== jMetrik ===
jMetrik is free and open source software for conducting a comprehensive psychometric analysis. Detailed information is listed above. jMetrik includes Huynh's decision consistency estimates if cut-scores are provided in the item analysis.

=== Lertap ===
Lertap calculates several statistics related to decision and classification consistency, including Livingston's coefficient, the Brennan-Kane dependability index, kappa, and an estimate of p(0), number of correct classifications as a proportion, derived by using the Peng-Subkoviac adaptation of Huynh's method. More detailed information concerning Lertap is provided above, under 'Classical test theory'.

== Other analyses ==
Most psychometric software is designed to analyze response data to evaluate item and test performance; most of the software above focuses on this. Some software is intended for other psychometric analyses.

=== SIFT ===
SIFT is designed for data forensics, namely, finding evidence of cheating or other behaviour that threatens the validity and integrity of the test. It is a Windows program with a point-and-click user interface and Microsoft Excel output.

=== Copy Detect ===
Copy Detect is an R package that is designed for data forensics, namely, finding evidence of cheating or other behaviour that threatens the validity and integrity of the test.

=== TestAssembler ===
TestAssembler is a Windows program that performs automated test assembly.

=== ATA ===
ATA is an R package for automated test assembly.

== General statistical analysis software ==
Software designed for general statistical analysis can often be used for certain types of psychometric analysis. Moreover, code for more advanced types of psychometric analysis is often available.

=== R ===
R is a programming environment designed for statistical computing and production of graphics. Basic R functionality can be extended through installing contributed 'packages', and a list of psychometric related packages is maintained on the CRAN website.

=== SAS ===
SAS is a commercially available package for statistical analysis and manipulation of data. It is also command-based.

=== SPSS ===
SPSS, originally called the Statistical Package for the Social Sciences, is a commercial general statistical analysis program where the data is presented in a spreadsheet layout and common analyses are menu driven.

=== S-Plus ===
S-Plus is a commercial analysis package based on the programming language S.

=== Stata ===
Stata is a commercial package. Stata's implementation of IRT includes 1, 2 and 3 parameter logistic models, graded response models, partial credit and generalized partial credit models, rating scale models, and a nominal response model for unordered categorical responses. It is driven by a control panel that allows the user to specify the model, examine fit numerically and graphically and investigate differential item functioning from a single interface.

== See also ==
- Psychological testing
- Automatic item generation
