= Item-total correlation =

The item–total correlation is the correlation between a scored item and the total test score. It is an item statistic used in psychometric analysis to diagnose assessment items that fail to indicate the underlying psychological trait so that they can be removed or revised.

== The item-total correlation in item analysis ==
In item analysis, an item–total correlation is usually calculated for each item of a scale or test to diagnose the degree to which assessment items indicate the underlying trait. Assuming that most of the items of an assessment do indicate the underlying trait, each item should have a reasonably strong positive correlation with the total score on that assessment. An important goal of item analysis is to identify and remove or revise items that are not good indicators of the underlying trait.

A small or negative item-correlation provides empirical evidence that the item is not measuring the same construct measured by the assessment. Exact values depend on the type of measure, but as a heuristic, a correlation value less than 0.2 indicates that the corresponding item does not correlate very well with the scale overall and, thus, it may be dropped. A negative value indicates that the item may be damaging the overall psychometric reliability of the measure. Identifying and removing (or revising) poorly-performing items is a critical way that psychometric analysis can improve the quality of a measure.

When items are scored dichotomously, as in exams with correct and incorrect answers, the item-total correlation may be calculated as either a point-biserial correlation or a biserial correlation. This is considered important because items vary in difficulty and the point-biserial correlation cannot attain its theoretical maxima [+1,-1] unless the proportion correct is 0.50 (50% answering the item correctly). The biserial correlation has a correction that, in theory, avoids this issue. In practice, analysts should choose either the point-biserial or biserial and not try to compare, because the correction of the biserial will always produce a slightly larger magnitude as compared to the point-biserial.

The item-reliability index (IRI) is defined as the product of the point-biserial item-total correlation and the item standard deviation. In classical test theory, the IRI indexes the degree to which an item contributes true score variance to the exam observed score variance. In practice, a negative IRI indicates the relative degree which an item damages the reliability estimate and a positive value indicates the relative degree which it contributes towards a high reliability estimate.

== See also ==
- Scale analysis
- Item analysis
- Classical test theory
- Likert scaling
