= Spearman–Brown prediction formula =

Psychometric reliability formula

The Spearman–Brown prediction formula, also known as the Spearman–Brown prophecy formula, is a formula relating psychometric reliability to test length and used by psychometricians to predict the reliability of a test after changing the test length. It is also vital to the "step-up" phase of split-half and related methods of estimating reliability. The method was published independently by Spearman (1910) and Brown (1910).

== Calculation ==
Predicted reliability, ${\rho}^*_{xx'}$, is estimated as:

$${\rho}^*_{xx'}=\frac{n{\rho}_{xx'}}{1+(n-1){\rho}_{xx'}}$$

where n is the number of "tests" combined (see below) and ${\rho}_{xx'}$ is the reliability of the current "test". The formula predicts the reliability of a new test composed by replicating the current test n times (or, equivalently, creating a test with n parallel forms of the current exam). If an 80-item test is reduced to a comparable set of 50 items, then n = 50/80 = 0.625. Thus n = 2 implies doubling the exam length by adding items with the same properties as those in the current exam. Values of n less than one may be used to predict the effect of shortening a test (e.g., n = 0.5 implies halving the test length).

== Forecasting test length ==
The formula can also be rearranged to predict the number of replications required to achieve a degree of reliability:

$$n=\frac{{\rho}^*_{xx'}(1-{\rho}_{xx'})}
{{\rho}_{xx'}(1-{\rho}^*_{xx'})}$$

For example, if a 50-item test has reliability ${\rho}_{xx'}=0.80$, then what test length is required for a reliability of ${\rho}^*_{xx'}=0.95$? n = 4.75, 4.75 * 50 = 237.5, so a test of about 238 comparable items is needed to achieve a reliability of 0.95.

== Use and related topics ==
This formula is commonly used by psychometricians to predict the reliability of a test after changing the test length. This relationship is particularly vital to the split-half and related methods of estimating reliability (where this method is sometimes known as the "Step Up" formula).

The formula is also helpful in understanding the nonlinear relationship between test reliability and test length. Test length must grow by increasingly larger values as the desired reliability approaches 1.0.

If the longer/shorter test is not parallel to the current test, then the prediction will not be strictly accurate. For example, if a highly reliable test was lengthened by adding many poor items then the achieved reliability will probably be much lower than that predicted by this formula.

For the reliability of a two-item test, the formula is more appropriate than Cronbach's alpha (used in this way, the Spearman-Brown formula is also called "standardized Cronbach's alpha", as it is the same as Cronbach's alpha computed using the average item intercorrelation and unit-item variance, rather than the average item covariance and average item variance).

== Relation to split-half reliability coefficients ==
=== Split-half reliability ===
Until the development of Cronbach's alpha, split-half reliability using the Spearman-Brown formula was the only way to obtain inter-item reliability. After splitting the whole exam into arbitrary halves, the correlation between the split-halves can be converted into reliability by applying the Spearman-Brown formula. That is,

${\rho}_{xx'} = \frac{2{\rho}_{12}}{1+{\rho}_{12}}$

, where ${\rho}_{12}$ is the Pearson correlation between the split-halves. Although the Spearman-Brown formula is rarely used as a split-half reliability coefficient after the development of Cronbach's alpha, this method is still useful for two-item scales.

==== Split-half reliability ====
When split halves can be assumed to be parallel, the Spearman–Brown formula can be used to "step-up" the correlation of the two halves (${\rho}_{12}$):

${\rho}_{XX'}=\frac{2{\rho}_{12}}{1+{\rho}_{12}}$

When the halves can be assumed to be essentially tau equivalent (and thus the variances of split-halves are not equal), Flanagan-Rulon suggested two possible estimates (${\rho} _ {FR1}$, ${\rho} _ {FR2}$),

${\rho}_{FR1}=\frac{4{\rho}_{12}{\sigma}_{1}{\sigma}_{2}}{{\sigma}^2_1+{\sigma}^2_2+2{\rho}_{12}{\sigma}_1{\sigma}_2}$,

${\rho}_{FR2}=1-\frac{{\sigma}^2_{D}}{{\sigma}^2_{X}}$,

Where ${\sigma} _ {1}$, ${\sigma} _ {2}$, ${\sigma} _ {X}$, and ${\sigma} _ {D}$ is the variance of the first split-half, the second half, the sum of the two split-halves, and the difference of the two split-halves, respectively.

Guttman suggested the following alternative:

${\lambda}_4=2(1-\frac{{\sigma}^2_1+{\sigma}^2_2}{{\sigma}^2_{X}})$.

Where, as before, ${\sigma}_{1}$, ${\sigma}_{2}$, and ${\sigma}_{X}$ is the variance of the first split-half, the second half, and the sum of the two split-halves, respectively.

==== Split-half congeneric reliability ====
The split-half congeneric reliability estimate allows the two halves to have unequal lengths. However, because there are more parameters that need to be estimated than the given pieces of information, another assumption is needed. Raju (1970) examined the split-half congeneric reliability coefficient when the relative length of each split-half was known. Angoff (1953) and Feldt (1975) published the split-half congeneric reliability assuming that the length of each split-half was proportional to the sum of the variances and covariances.

== History ==
The name Spearman-Brown seems to imply a partnership, but the two authors were competitive. This formula originates from two papers published simultaneously by Brown (1910) and Spearman (1910) in the British Journal of Psychology. Charles Spearman had a hostile relationship with Karl Pearson who worked together in King's College London, and they exchanged papers that criticized and ridiculed each other. William Brown received his Ph.D. under Pearson's guidance. An important part of Brown's doctoral dissertation was devoted to criticizing Spearman's work on the rank correlation. Spearman appears first in this formula before Brown because he is a more prestigious scholar than Brown. For example, Spearman established the first theory of reliability and is called "the father of classical reliability theory." This is an example of Matthew Effect or Stigler's law of eponymy.

This formula should be referred to as the Brown-Spearman formula for the following reasons: First, the formula we use today is not Spearman's (1910) version, but Brown's (1910). Brown (1910) explicitly presented this formula as a split-half reliability coefficient, but Spearman (1910) did not. Second, the formal derivation of Brown (1910) is more concise and elegant than that of Spearman (1910). Third, it is likely that Brown (1910) was written before Spearman (1910). Brown (1910) is based on his doctoral dissertation, which was already available at the time of publication. Spearman (1910) criticized Brown (1910), but Brown (1910) criticized only Spearman (1904). Fourth, it is the APA style to list the authors in alphabetical order.
