= Kuder–Richardson formulas =

Measures in psychometrics

In psychometrics, the Kuder–Richardson formulas, first published in 1937, are a measure of internal consistency reliability for measures with dichotomous choices. They were developed by Kuder and Richardson.

== Kuder–Richardson Formula 20 (KR-20) ==
The name of this formula stems from the fact that is the twentieth formula discussed in Kuder and Richardson's seminal paper on test reliability.

It is a special case of Cronbach's α, computed for dichotomous scores. It is often claimed that a high KR-20 coefficient (e.g., > 0.90) indicates a homogeneous test. However, like Cronbach's α, homogeneity (that is, unidimensionality) is actually an assumption, not a conclusion, of reliability coefficients. It is possible, for example, to have a high KR-20 with a multidimensional scale, especially with a large number of items.

Values can range from 0.00 to 1.00 (sometimes expressed as 0 to 100), with high values indicating that the examination is likely to correlate with alternate forms (a desirable characteristic). The KR-20 may be affected by difficulty of the test, the spread in scores and the length of the examination.

In the case when scores are not tau-equivalent (for example when there is not homogeneous but rather examination items of increasing difficulty) then the KR-20 is an indication of the lower bound of internal consistency (reliability).

The formula for KR-20 for a test with K test items numbered i = 1 to K is

$$r= \frac{K}{K-1} \left[ 1 - \frac{\sum_{i=1}^K p_i q_i}{\sigma^2_X} \right]$$

where p_{i} is the proportion of correct responses to test item i, q_{i} is the proportion of incorrect responses to test item i (so that p_{i} + q_{i} = 1), and the variance for the denominator is

$$\sigma^2_X = \frac{\sum_{i=1}^n (X_i-\bar{X})^2\,{}}{n}.$$

where n is the total sample size, X__{i} is the sum of items correct for the ith respondent and $\bar{X}$ is the mean of X__{i} values.

If it is important to use unbiased operators then the sum of squares should be divided by degrees of freedom (n − 1) and the probabilities are multiplied by $n/(n-1).$

== Kuder–Richardson Formula 21 (KR-21) ==
Often discussed in tandem with KR-20, is Kuder–Richardson Formula 21 (KR-21). KR-21 is a simplified version of KR-20, which can be used when the difficulty of all items on the test are known to be equal. Like KR-20, KR-21 was first set forth as the twenty-first formula discussed in Kuder and Richardson's 1937 paper.

The formula for KR-21 is as such:

$$r= \frac{K}{K-1} \left[ 1 - \frac{Kp(1-p)}{\sigma^2_X} \right]$$

Similarly to KR-20, K is equal to the number of items. Difficulty level of the items (p), is assumed to be the same for each item, however, in practice, KR-21 can be applied by finding the average item difficulty across the entirety of the test. KR-21 tends to be a more conservative estimate of reliability than KR-20, which in turn is a more conservative estimate than Cronbach's α.
