= Scale analysis =

Scale analysis may refer to:

- Scale analysis (mathematics)
- Scale analysis (statistics)
