= G theory =

G theory may refer to:

- g factor in psychology
- Generalizability theory in the measurement theory
