= Lisa Spanierman =

American psychologist

- Born: Lisa Beth Spanierman
- Education: Teachers College, Columbia University; University of Missouri
- Awards: Fritz and Lynn Kuder Early Career Award from the American Psychological Association's Society of Counseling Psychology (2012)
- Scientific career
- Fields: Counseling psychology
- Institutions: Arizona State University
- Thesis: Construction and initial validation of the Psychosocial Costs of Racism to Whites Scale (PCRW) (2002)

Lisa Beth Spanierman is an American psychologist who is professor of Counseling and Counseling Psychology in the College of Integrative Sciences and Arts at Arizona State University. Her research focuses on racial attitudes, microaggressions, and related topics. A fellow of the American Psychological Association, she received the Fritz and Lynn Kuder Early Career Award from the Association's Society of Counseling Psychology in 2012. She is the co-author of the book Microaggressions in Everyday Life.
