= Congeneric reliability =

Concept in statistical models applied to psychometrics

In statistical models applied to psychometrics, congeneric reliability $\rho_C$ ("rho C") a single-administration test score reliability (i.e., the reliability of persons over items holding occasion fixed) coefficient, commonly referred to as composite reliability, construct reliability, and coefficient omega. $\rho_C$ is a structural equation model (SEM)-based reliability coefficients and is obtained from a unidimensional model. $\rho_C$ is the second most commonly used reliability factor after Cronbach's alpha), and is often recommended as its alternative.

== History and names ==
A quantity similar (but not mathematically equivalent) to congeneric reliability first appears in the appendix to McDonald's 1970 paper on factor analysis, labeled $\theta$. In McDonald's work, the new quantity is primarily a mathematical convenience: a well-behaved intermediate that separates two values. Seemingly unaware of McDonald's work, Jöreskog first analyzed a quantity equivalent to congeneric reliability in a paper the following year. Jöreskog defined congeneric reliability (now labeled ρ) with coordinate-free notation, and three years later, Werts gave the modern, coordinatized formula for the same. Both of the latter two papers named the new quantity simply "reliability". The modern name originates with Jöreskog's name for the model whence he derived $\rho_{C}$: a "congeneric model".

Applied statisticians have subsequently coined many names for ${\rho}_{C}$. "Composite reliability" emphasizes that ${\rho}_{C}$ measures the statistical reliability of composite scores. As psychology calls "constructs" any latent characteristics only measurable through composite scores, ${\rho}_{C}$ has also been called "construct reliability". Following McDonald's more recent expository work on testing theory, some SEM-based reliability coefficients, including congeneric reliability, are referred to as "reliability coefficient $\omega$", often without a definition.

== Formula and calculation ==
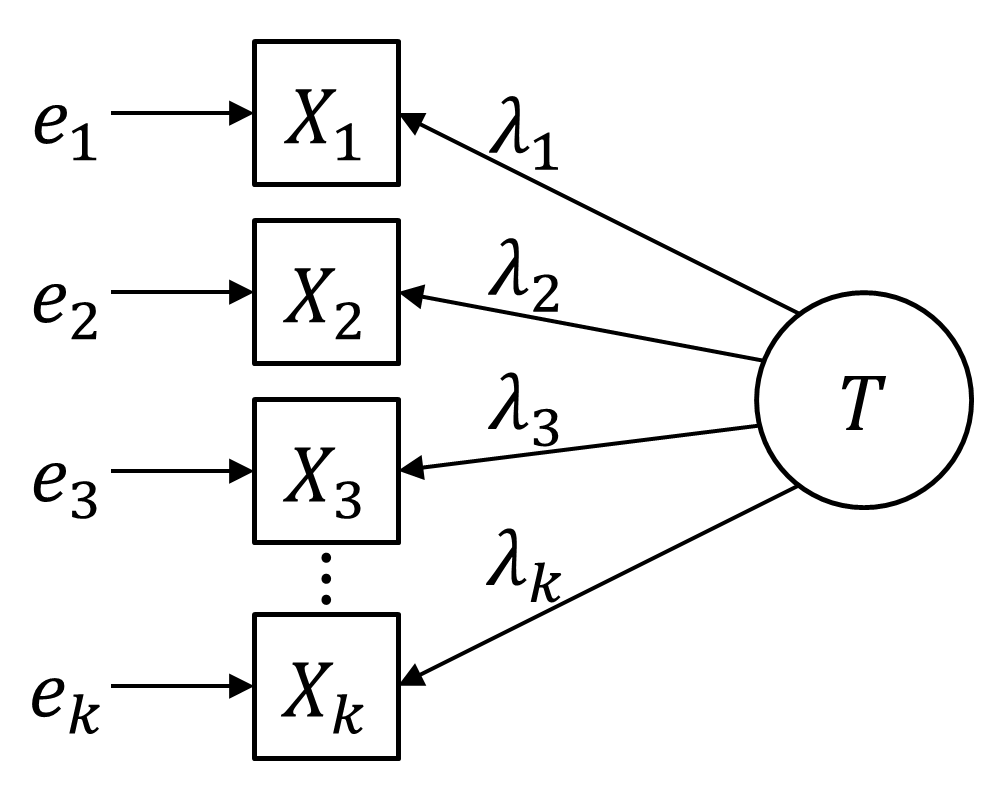
Congeneric measurement model

Congeneric reliability applies to datasets of vectors: each row X in the dataset is a list X_{i} of numerical scores corresponding to one individual. The congeneric model supposes that there is a single underlying property ("factor") of the individual F, such that each numerical score X_{i} is a noisy measurement of F. Moreover, that the relationship between X and F is approximately linear: there exist (non-random) vectors λ and μ such that
$$X_i=\lambda_iF+\mu_i+E_i\text{,}$$
where E_{i} is a statistically independent noise term.

In this context, λ_{i} is often referred to as the factor loading on item i.

Because λ and μ are free parameters, the model exhibits affine invariance, and F may be normalized to mean 0 and variance 1 without loss of generality. The fraction of variance explained in item X_{i} by F is then simply
$$\rho_i=\frac{\lambda_i^2}{\lambda_i^2+\mathbb{V}[E_i]}\text{.}$$
More generally, given any covector w, the proportion of variance in wX explained by F is
$$\rho=\frac{(w\lambda)^2}{(w\lambda)^2+\mathbb{E}[(wE)^2]}\text{,}$$
which is maximized when w ∝ 𝔼[EE^{*}]^{−1}λ.

ρ_{C} is this proportion of explained variance in the case where w ∝ [1 1 ... 1] (all components of X equally important):
$$\rho_C = \frac{ \left( \sum_{i=1}^k \lambda_i \right)^2 }{ \left( \sum_{i=1}^k \lambda_i \right)^2 + \sum_{i=1}^k \sigma^2_{E_i} }$$

=== Example ===
Fitted/implied covariance matrix
	$X_1$	$X_2$	$X_3$	$X_4$
$X_1$	$10.00$			
$X_2$	$4.42$	$11.00$		
$X_3$	$4.98$	$5.71$	$12.00$	
$X_4$	$6.98$	$7.99$	$9.01$	$13.00$
$\Sigma$	$124.23 = \Sigma_{diagonal} + 2 \times \Sigma_{subdiagonal}$			

These are the estimates of the factor loadings and errors:

Factor loadings and errors
	$\hat{\lambda}_i$	$\hat{\sigma}^{2}_{e_i}$
$X_1$	$1.96$	$6.13$
$X_2$	$2.25$	$5.92$
$X_3$	$2.53$	$5.56$
$X_4$	$3.55$	$.37$
$\Sigma$	$10.30$	$18.01$
$\Sigma^2$	$106.22$	

$$\hat{\rho}_{C} = \frac{ \left( \sum_{i=1}^k \hat{\lambda}_i \right)^2 }{ \hat{\sigma}^{2}_{X} } = \frac{ 106.22 }{ 124.23 } = .8550$$

$$\hat{\rho}_{C} = \frac{ \left( \sum_{i=1}^k \hat{\lambda}_i \right)^2 }{ \left( \sum_{i=1}^k \hat{\lambda}_i \right)^2 + \sum_{i=1}^k \hat{\sigma}^{2}_{e_i} } = \frac{ 106.22 }{ 106.22 + 18.01 } = .8550$$

Compare this value with the value of applying Cronbach's alpha to the same data.

== Related coefficients ==
Cronbach's alpha ($\alpha$) assumes that all factor loadings are equal (i.e. $\lambda_1=\lambda_2=...=\lambda_k$). In reality, this is rarely the case and, thus, it systematically underestimates the reliability. In contrast, congeneric reliability ($\rho_C$) explicitly acknowledges the existence of different factor loadings. According to Bagozzi & Yi (1988), $\rho_C$ should have a value of at least around 0.6. Often, higher values are desirable. However, such values should not be misunderstood as strict cutoff boundaries between "good" and "bad". Moreover, $\rho_{C}$ values close to 1 might indicate that items are too similar. Another property of a "good" measurement model besides reliability is construct validity.

A related coefficient is average variance extracted.
