= G. Frederic Kuder =

Counseling psychologist and psychometrician

G. Frederic (Fritz) Kuder (1903–2000) was a counseling psychologist and psychometrician. He was a founding member and the second president of the Division of Counseling Psychology of the American Psychological Association; cofounder of Personnel Psychology, and founder and editor of Educational and Psychological Measurement.

Kuder is noted for his contribution to the field of interest inventories for vocational counseling and developed three types of interest inventories. The first was the Kuder Preference Record - Vocational (KPR-V), which was published in 1938. This was a unique assessment tool during its time although it drew from the same sources as the Strong Vocational Interest Bank. Then, in 1956, he introduced the so-called Kuder Occupational Interest Survey (KOIS), Form D. The third type of inventory he developed was the Kuder Career Search (KCS) With Person Match, an inventory innovation that evaluates the individual's interests by comparing it with other people with different jobs. He also helped develop the KR20 formula.
