= Melvin R. Novick =

American statistician

- Born: September 21, 1932; Chicago, Illinois, U.S.
- Died: May 20, 1986 (aged 53)
- Education: Roosevelt University; University of North Carolina at Chapel Hill
- Occupation: Statistician
- Employer: University of Iowa
- Spouse: Naomi J. Spark
- Children: 1 son, 1 daughter

Melvin R. Novick (September 21, 1932 – May 20, 1986) was an American statistician. He was a professor of Statistics at the University of Iowa, and a consultant for the Educational Testing Service (ETS).

== Books ==
- Standards for Educational and Psychological Testing. American Psychological Association (APA). 1985. ISBN 9780912704951.
