= Review site =

Website on which reviews can be posted about people, businesses, products, or services

A review site is a website on which reviews can be posted about people, businesses, products, or services. These sites may use Web 2.0 techniques to gather reviews from site users or may employ professional writers to author reviews on the topic of concern for the site.

Early examples of review sites included ConsumerDemocracy.com, Complaints.com, planetfeedback.com, Epinions.com and ThatGuyWithTheGlasses.com (later rebranded to Channel Awesome in 2014).

== Business models ==
Review sites are generally supported by advertising. Some business review sites may also allow businesses to pay for enhanced listings, which do not affect the reviews and ratings. Product review sites may be supported by providing affiliate links to the websites that sell the reviewed items, which pay the site on a per-click or per-sale basis.

With the growing popularity of affiliate programs on the Internet, a new sort of review site has emerged: the affiliate product review site. This type of site is usually professionally designed and written to maximize conversions, and is used by e-commerce marketers. It is often based on a blog platform like WordPress or Squarespace, has a privacy and contact page to help with SEO, and has commenting and interactivity turned off. It will also have an e-mail gathering device in the form of an opt-in, or drop-down list to help the aspiring e-commerce business person build an e-mail list to market to.

Because of the specialized marketing thrust of this type of website, the reviews are not always seen to be objective by consumers. Because of this, the FTC has provided several guidelines requiring publishers to disclose when they benefit monetarily from the content in the form of advertising, affiliate marketing, etc.

== Impact ==
Studies by independent research groups show that rating and review sites influence consumer shopping behavior. In an academic study published in 2008, empirical results demonstrated that the number of online user reviews is a good indicator of the intensity of underlying word-of-mouth effect and increase awareness.

The growing use of artificial intelligence for product discovery has also been associated with continued reliance on review sites for verification. A 2026 survey of 1,000 U.S. consumers found that 98 percent of respondents conducted additional research before purchasing from an unfamiliar brand recommended by an AI system, with reading online reviews among the methods consumers used to verify recommendations.

== Anonymity ==
Originally, reviews were generally anonymous, and in many countries, review sites often have policies that preclude the release of any identifying information without a court order. According to Kurt Opsahl, a staff attorney for the Electronic Frontier Foundation (EFF), anonymity of reviewers is important.

Reviewers are always required to provide an email address and are often encouraged to use their real name. Yelp also requires a photo of the reviewer.

== Rating site ==
A rating site (commonly known as a rate-me site) is a website designed for users to vote, rate people, content, or other things. Rating sites can range from tangible to non-tangible attributes, but most commonly, rating sites are based around physical appearances such as body parts, voice, personality, etc. They may also be devoted to the subjects' occupational ability, for example teachers, professors, lawyers, doctors, etc. Rating sites can typically be on anything a user can think of.

=== Features ===
Rating sites typically show a series of images (or other content) in random fashion, or chosen by computer algorithm, instead of allowing users to choose. Users are given a choice of rating or assessment, which is generally done quickly and without great deliberation. Users score items on a scale of 1 to 10, yes or no. Others, such as BabeVsBabe.com, ask users to choose between two pictures. Typically, the site gives instant feedback in terms of the item's running score, or the percentage of other users who agree with the assessment. Rating sites sometimes offer aggregate statistics or "best" and "worst" lists. Most allow users to submit their own image, sample, or other relevant content for others to rate. Some require the submission as a condition of membership.

Rating sites usually provide some features of social network services and online communities such as discussion forums messaging, and private messaging. Some function as a form of dating service, in that for a fee they allow users to contact other users. Many social networks and other sites include rating features. For example, MySpace and TradePics have optional "rank" features for users to be rated by other users.

=== Subject matter ===
One category of rating sites, such as Hot or Not or HotFlation, is devoted to rating contributors' physical attractiveness. Other looks-based rating sites include RateMyFace.com (an early site, launched in the Summer of 1999) and NameMyVote, which asks users to guess a person's political party based on their looks. Some sites are devoted to rating the appearance of pets (e.g. kittenwar.com, petsinclothes.com, and meormypet.com). Another class allows users to rate short video or music clips. One variant, a "Darwinian poetry" site, allows users to compare two samples of entirely computer-generated poetry using a Condorcet method. Successful poems "mate" to produce poems of ever-increasing appeal. Yet others are devoted to disliked men (DoucheBagAlert), bowel movements (ratemypoo.com), unsigned bands (RateBandsOnline.com), politics (RateMyTory.Com), nightclubs, business professionals, clothes, cars, and many other subjects.

When rating sites are dedicated to rating products (epinions.com), brands (brandmojo.org), services, or businesses rather than to rating people (i-rate.me), and are used for more serious or well thought-out ratings, they tend to be called review sites, although the distinction is not exact.

== History ==
The popularity of rating people and their abilities on a scale, such as 1–10, traces back to at least the late 20th century, and the algorithms for aggregating quantitative rating scores far earlier than that. The 1979 film 10 is an example of this. The title derives from a rating system Dudley Moore uses to grade women based upon beauty, with a 10 being the epitome of attractiveness. The notion of a "perfect ten" came into common usage as a result of this film. In the film, Moore rates Bo Derek an "11".

In 1990, one of the first computer-based photographic attractiveness rating studies was conducted. During this year psychologists J. H. Langlois and L. A. Roggman examined whether facial attractiveness was linked to geometric averageness. To test their hypothesis, they selected photographs of 192 male and female Caucasian faces; each of which was computer scanned and digitized. They then made computer-processed composites of each image, as 2-, 4-, 8-, 16-, and 32-face composites. The individual and composite faces were then rated for attractiveness by 300 judges on a 5-point Likert scale (1 = very unattractive, 5 = very attractive). The 32-composite face was the most visually attractive of all the faces. Subsequent studies were done on a 10-point scale.

In 1992, Perfect 10 magazine and video programming was launched by Xui, the original executive editor of Spin magazine, to feature only women who would rank 10 for attractiveness. Julie Kruis, a swimsuit model, was the original spokesmodel. In 1996, Rasen created the first "Perfect 10 Model Search" at the Pure Platinum club near Fort Lauderdale, Florida. His contests were broadcast on Network 1, a domestic C-band satellite channel. Other unrelated "Perfect 10" contests became popular throughout the 1990s.

The first ratings sites started in 1999, with RateMyFace.com (created by Michael Hussey) and TeacherRatings.com (created by John Swapceinski, re-launched with Hussey and further developed by Patrick Nagle as RateMyProfessors). The most popular of all time, Hot or Not, was launched in October 2000. Hot or Not generated many spin-offs and imitators. There are now hundreds of such sites, and even meta-sites that categorize them all. The rating site concept has also been expanded to include Twitter and Facebook accounts that provide ratings, such as the humorous Twitter account WeRateDogs.

== Criticism ==
Most review sites make little or no attempt to restrict postings, or to verify the information in the reviews. Critics point out that positive reviews are sometimes written by the businesses or individuals being reviewed, while negative reviews may be written by competitors, disgruntled employees, or anyone with a grudge against the business being reviewed. Some merchants also offer incentives for customers to review their products favorably, which skews reviews in their favor. So called reputation management firms may also submit false positive reviews on behalf of businesses. In 2011, RateMDs.com and Yelp detected dozens of positive reviews of doctors, submitted from the same IP addresses by a firm called Medical Justice.

Furthermore, studies of research methodology have shown that in forums where people are able to post opinions publicly, group polarization often occurs, and the result is very positive comments, very negative comments, and little in between, meaning that those who would have been in the middle are either silent or pulled to one extreme or the other.

Rating sites have a social feedback effect; some high school principals and administrators, for example, have begun to regularly monitor the status of their teaching staff via student controlled "rating sites". Some looks-based sites have come under criticism for promoting vanity and self-consciousness. Some claim they potentially expose users to sexual predators. Most rating sites suffer from similar self-selection bias since only highly motivated individuals devote their time to completing these rankings, and not a fair sampling of the population.

=== Response to criticism ===
Many operators of review sites acknowledge that reviews may not be objective, and that ratings may not be statistically valid.

In some cases, government authorities have taken legal actions against businesses that post false reviews. In 2009, the State of New York required Lifestyle Lift, a cosmetic surgery company, to pay $300,000 in fines.

== See also ==
- Accuracy barrier
- Bogardus social distance scale
- Consensus based assessment
- Diamond of opposites
- Employer review website
- F-scale
- Guttman scale
- Phrase completion scales
- Rating scale
- Recommender system
- Reddit
- Reputation management
- Reputation system
- Thurstone scale
- Trust metric
- Star (classification)
