= Phrase completions =

Psychometric scale used in questionnaires

Phrase completion scales are a type of psychometric scale used in questionnaires. Developed in response to the problems associated with Likert scales, phrase completions are concise, unidimensional measures that tap ordinal level data in a manner that approximates interval level data.

== Overview of the phrase completion method ==
Phrase completions consist of a phrase followed by an eleven-point response key. The phrase introduces part of the concept. Marking a reply on the response key completes the concept. The response key represents the underlying theoretical continuum. Zero (0) indicates the absence of the construct, while ten (10) indicates the theorized maximum amount of the construct. Response keys are reversed on alternate items to mitigate response set bias.

== Sample question using the phrase completion method ==
I am aware of the presence of God or the Divine

  Never                                                                       Continually                                                                            
   0	    1	    2	    3	    4	    5	    6	    7	    8	    9	    10

== Scoring and analysis ==
After the questionnaire is completed, the score on each item is summed together to create a test score for the respondent. Hence, phrase completions, like Likert scales, are often considered to be summative scales.

== Level of measurement ==
The response categories represent an ordinal level of measurement. Ordinal level data, however, varies in terms of how closely it approximates interval level data. By using a numerical continuum as the response key instead of sentiments that reflect intensity of agreement, respondents may be able to quantify their responses in more equal units.

== See also ==
- Likert scale
- Analog scale
- Guttman scale
- Thurstone scale
- Mokken scale
- Bogardus Social Distance Scale
- F-scale
- Discan scale
- Diamond of opposites
