= Edinburgh Feeding Evaluation in Dementia Scale =

- Purpose: used to assess feeding difficulty in older people with dementia

The Edinburgh Feeding Evaluation in Dementia (EdFED) Scale is a psychometric screening tool to assess difficulty with self-feeding in older people with dementia. It was developed at The University of Edinburgh by Roger Watson and Ian Deary.

The original EdFED was composed of 11 items and was validated using Guttman scaling but a subsequent version was validated using Mokken scaling and was composed of only ten items. The scale measures aspects of the level of intervention required by carers (for example, verbal prompting), observations related to feeding (for example, spillage) and behavioural aspects (for example, refusal to eat). The items are scored on a three-point Likert type scale from ‘0’ (never) to ‘3’ (often) observed items on the scale. In 2014 Alzheimers Disease International highlighted the utility of the EdFED in their ‘’’Nutrition and Dementia’’’ report.

The EdFED has been translated and validated in several languages including Chinese (Taiwanese and Mainland) and Italian. The scale was used as an outcome measure of the first randomised controlled trial of an intervention to alleviate feeding difficulty and has been used as an outcome measure in a national study of feeding difficulty in older people with dementia in Canada; In this study it was shown that a 1-unit change in the EdFED score is equivalent to a loss of 63 kilocalories and 3 grams of protein per day.
