= Facet (disambiguation) =

A facet is a flat surface of a geometric shape, e.g., of a cut gemstone.

Facet may also refer to:

== Arts, entertainment, and media ==
- Facets (album), an album by Jim Croce
- Facets, a 1980 album by jazz pianist Monty Alexander and his trio
- "Facets" (DS9 episode), an episode of Star Trek: Deep Space Nine
- FACETS, a scholarly journal published by Canadian Science Publishing

== Biology and healthcare ==
- Facet (psychology), a component of a personality trait
- Facet, a part of a compound eye
- Facet joint, or zygapophyseal joint, a type (zygapophyseal) of vertebral joint
- FACETS ("Fast Analog Computing with Emerging Transient States"), a neuroscience project

== Other uses ==
- Facet (geometry), the formalization of the same notion
- Facets Multi-Media, a Chicago-area non-profit arts organization
- Facet theory, a metatheory for the behavioral sciences

== See also ==
- Faceted (disambiguation)
- Faceting
- Faceted search
