= Roger Watson (academic) =

British academic (born 1955)

- Born: 20 November 1955 (age 70); Aberdeen, Scotland, UK
- Citizenship: British; Irish
- Known for: Research on Nursing and Mokken scales
- Spouse: Deborah Watson

Academic background
- Education: University of Edinburgh; University of Sheffield; St George's Hospital
- Doctoral advisor: Michael W Fowler

Academic work
- Discipline: Nursing
- Institutions: University of Edinburgh; University of Sheffield; Dublin City University; University of Hull; University of Navarra; Southwest Medical University; Saint Francis University, Hong Kong; Western Sydney University; University of Genoa; National University of Singapore; Chinese University of Hong Kong; Hong Kong Polytechnic University

Roger Watson (born 20 November 1955) is a British academic. He is Professor of Nursing, Saint Francis University, Hong Kong.

He is the editor-in-chief of Nurse Education in Practice. Watson was the Founding Chair of the Lancet Commission on Nursing, and a founding member of the Global Advisory Panel on the Future of Nursing & Midwifery. Watson was elected Vice President of the National Conference of University Professors in 2020 and became President in 2022 until 2024. Watson is a First Gulf War veteran having served with 205 General Hospital RAMC(v) (Later 205 Field Hospital now merged with 225 Medical Regiment to form 215 Multirole Medical Regiment).

== Education ==
Watson was a registered nurse (St George's Hospital London), holds a BSc in biological sciences from the University of Edinburgh, and a PhD in biochemistry from the University of Sheffield.

== Professional life ==
Watson's clinical area is gerontological nursing with a special interest in mealtime and nutritional difficulties of older people with dementia. His research into the alleviation of mealtime difficulty in people with dementia led to the development of the "Edinburgh Feeding Evaluation in Dementia Scale". Watson is a proponent of the application of Mokken scaling in nursing research and has also contributed to the understanding of the general application of Mokken scaling and the influence of sample size on Mokken scaling parameters.

Watson has held visiting positions in Spain, Slovenia, Australia, Hong Kong, Singapore, Ireland and Italy. He served as a member of the sub-panel for Nursing and Midwifery in the UK Research Assessment Exercise in 2008, and in 2014 on the sub-panel for Dentistry, Allied Health Professions, Nursing and Pharmacy in the UK Research Excellence Framework.

Previously, he was the editor-in-chief of the Journal of Clinical Nursing, the Journal of Advanced Nursing, the founding editor of Nursing Open and an Editorial Board Member of the WikiJournal of Medicine. Watson is a frequent contributor to Times Higher Education, The Conversation, The Salisbury Review, The European Conservative and The Daily Sceptic. He has contributed to Catholic Herald and New English Review. Watson is listed in the Academics for Academic Freedom The Banned List.

== Awards and recognition ==
Watson is a fellow of the Royal College of Nursing (2009), the American Academy of Nursing (2007), the Royal College of Physicians of Edinburgh (2014), a Fellow of the Higher Education Academy (2007), a Fellow of the Royal College of Surgeons in Ireland Faculty of Nursing and Midwifery ad eundem (2009) and the National Conference of University Professors (2018). Watson is a Member of the Academia Europaea (2019). Watson was formerly a Fellow of the Royal Society of Biology (2001-2019; formerly the Institute of Biology), a Fellow of the Royal Society of Arts (2001-2019) and a Fellow of the European Academy of Nursing Science (2005-2022). In 2021 Watson was awarded the honorary degree of Doctor Honoris Causa by the University of Maribor, Slovenia.

Watson delivered the Winifred Raphael Memorial Lecture in 2001. In 2017 Watson was inducted into the Sigma Theta Tau International Nurse Researcher Hall of Fame. That year, Watson also delivered the annual Elsie Stephenson Memorial Lecture at The University of Edinburgh. In 2022 he was awarded the Margaret Comerford Freda award for Editorial Leadership in Nursing Publication by the International Academy of Nursing Editors. In 2023 Sigma Nursing European Region included Watson in the list celebrating Sigma's centenary by celebrating 100 nurses from the last 100 years in Europe. Watson is included in the Stanford list of top 2% scientists in his field.

== Personal life ==
Born to Margaret McCabe and William Morrison Watson Watson is a former pupil of Banchory Academy. Watson is a haiku poet and a member of the British Haiku Society and former member of the Haiku Society of America with entries in the Living Haiku Anthology, the Living Senryu Anthology and The Haiku Foundation's Haiku Registry. In 2018, 2019 and 2020, he was selected as one of the European Top 100 most creative haiku authors. A Roman Catholic, he is married to Deborah Watson (née Yould) and they have eight children and ten grandchildren.

== Bibliography ==
- Watson R (1993) Caring for elderly people Baillière Tindall, London ISBN 0702015873
- Watson R (Ed) (1995) Accountability in nursing practice Chapman & Hall, London ISBN 041249860X
- Watson R (1995) Anatomy and physiology for nurses 10th edition Baillière Tindall, London ISBN 0702018015
- Hinchliff SM, Montague SE, Watson R (Eds) (1996) Physiology for nursing practice 2nd edition Baillière Tindall, London ISBN 0702016381
- Watson R (1997) Parawatan pada Lansia (Indonesian translation of Caring for elderly people) Penerbit Buku Kedokteran, Jakarta ISBN 9794486205
- Watson R (1997) Anatomi & Fisiologi untuk Parawat (Indonesian translation of Anatomy and physiology for nurses) Penerbit Buku Kedokteran, ISBN 9794485683
- Watson R (1999) Essential science for nursing students Baillière Tindall, London ISBN 0702021261
- Watson R (1999) Ciência essencial para estudantes de enfermagem Lusociencia, Loures (Portuguese translation of Essential science for nursing students) ISBN 9728383185
- Watson R (2000) Anatomy and physiology for nurses 11th edition Baillière Tindall, London ISBN 0702025852
- Watson R, Fawcett JN (2003) Pathophysiology, homeostasis and nursing care Routledge, London ISBN 0415275490
- Hinchliff SM, Montague SE, Watson R (Eds) (2004) Fisiiologia per la practica infermieristica Casa Editrice Ambrosiana, Milano (Italian translation of Physiology for nursing practice 2nd edition) ISBN 8840812814
- Tilley S, Watson R (Eds) (2004) Accountability in nursing and midwifery 2nd edition, Blackwell, Oxford ISBN 0632064692
- Watson R (2005) Anatomy and physiology for nurses 12th edition Baillière Tindall, London ISBN 0702027499
- Smith GD, Watson R (2005) Gastrointestinal nursing Blackwell, Oxford ISBN 0632052945
- Hinchliff S, Watson R, Herbert R (2005) Physiology for nursing practice 3rd edition Elsevier, Edinburgh ISBN 070202676X
- Heath HJ, Watson R (2005) Older people: assessment for health and social care Age Concern, London ISBN 0862423767
- Watson R, Atkinson I, Egerton P (2005) Successful statistics for nursing and healthcare Palgrave, Basingstoke ISBN 1403916527
- Watson R (2007) 护理学解剖学与生理学 (第12版)(Mandarin Chinese translation of Anatomy and physiology for nurses 12th edition Elsevier, Singapore ISBN 9812596585
- Watson R, McKenna H, Cowman S, Keady J (Ed's) (2008) Nursing research: design and methods Elsevier, Edinburgh (ISBN 9780443102776
- Watson R (2011) Anatomy and physiology for nurses 13th edition Baillière Tindall Elsevier, Edinburgh ISBN 9780702043581
- Zang Y, Zhao Y, Watson R (Eds) (2011) Adolescent health and development studies People's Publishing House, Beijing ISBN 9787117150866
- McSherry W, McSherry R, Watson R (Eds) (2012) Care in nursing Oxford University Press, Oxford ISBN 9780199583850
- Holland K, Watson R (Eds) (2012) Writing for publication in nursing and healthcare: getting it right Wiley-Blackwell, Oxford ISBN 9780470657829
- Smith GD, Shen C (Eds), Watson R, Li L (Ass Eds) (2013) Studying nursing in UK for Chinese People People's Medical Publishing House, Beijing
- Holland K, Watson R (2018) Публикации по сестринскому делу и здравоохранению: как писать правильно (Russian translation of Writing for publication in nursing and healthcare: getting it right) Hayka, Moscow ISBN 9785020401099
- Watson R (2018) Anatomy and physiology for nurses 14th edition Elsevier, London ISBN 9780702077418
- Holland K, Watson R (Eds) (2021) Writing for publication in nursing and healthcare: getting it right 2nd edition Wiley-Blackwell, Oxford ISBN 9781119583639
- Gosak L, Cilar Budler l, Watson R, Štiglic G (2024) Advanced Quantitative Research Methods in Nursing University of Maribor, University Press, Maribor ISBN 9789612868888
- Gosak L, Cilar Budler l, Watson R, Štiglic G (2025) Napredne kvantitativne raziskovalne metode v zdravstveni negi (Slovenian translation of Advanced Quantitative Research Methods in Nursing) University of Maribor, University Press, Maribor ISBN 9789612869526
