= Yael Fisher =

Professor of Education in Israel

- יעל פישר
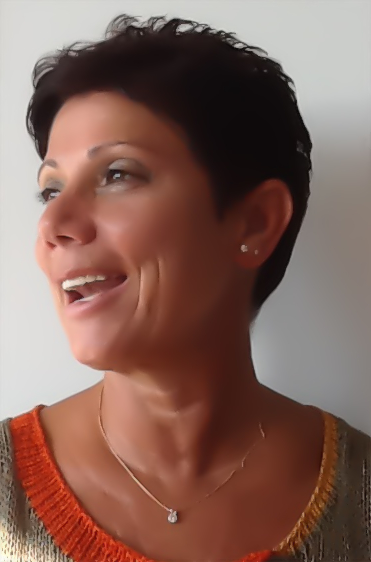
- Born: Jerusalem, Israel
- Education: Jerusalem Academy of Music and Dance; Hebrew University of Jerusalem
- Scientific career
- Fields: Education
- Workplaces: Achva Academic College

Yael Fisher (Hebrew: יעל פישר; born 1953) is an associate professor at Achva Academic College in Israel. From 2016 to February 2019, she served as the college rector.

== Biography ==
Her father, Itzhak Avni, was born in Berlin, Germany, and immigrated to Israel with the Youth Aliya in 1933, immediately after the Nazi regime came to power. He became the CEO of the Israel Coins and Medals Corp and the Vice-CEO of the Israeli Prime Minister's Office.

Her maternal grandfather was the artist and painter Meir Gur-Aryeh. Her mother, Jerusalem-born Leah Avni, the sixth generation of native Israelis in her family, was a chief nurse at the Hadassah Mount Scopus Hospital.

Fisher was born and raised in Rehavia, Jerusalem, in a family of three girls and a boy. She attended the Hebrew Rehavia Gymnasium (graduated 1971). She was part of the Israeli team that won the 100X4 relay race at the Eighth Maccabiah, held in Israel in 1969. She was the Jerusalem champion in Floor and Artistic Gymnastics 1970. During her mandatory IDF service, she was a social services officer in the Sinai Peninsula, and later transferred to Training Command and was honorably discharged at the rank of first lieutenant.

After her military service, she completed the first year of studies as part of the first class to attend Ben-Gurion University's School of Medicine. Between 1975 and 1978, she studied at the Jerusalem Academy of Music and Dance and has a B.MUS in Dance. She attained MA (1989–1991) and PhD (1995–1998) degrees in Education Administration at the Hebrew University of Jerusalem. Her thesis and doctorate dealt with parental involvement in education. Her doctoral advisors were Professor Haim Adler and Professor Itzhak Friedman. Between 1982 and 1989, she founded and ran a dance school as part of the Gderot regional council.

Between 1990–1996, she founded and ran the Study Center for Gifted, Science- and Arts-loving Youth at the Achva College of Education. In 1996, she was the first Academic Secretary of Achva when the college became an accredited academic institution. Between 1997 and 1999, she managed the Michigan/Israel Bureau and was the Community and Aliyah (immigration to Israel) Jewish Federation of Metropolitan Detroit, MI., US After returning to Israel, she went back to teach at Achva and at the same time developed and ran an experimental course for training school principals, at the Henrietta Szold Institute in Jerusalem.

In 2002, she participated in developing an M.Ed. program in educational administration at Achva Academic College, the first college in Israel to offer a postgraduate program in the field of educational administration. During this period, she also advised local authorities and governmental organizations on the issue of minimizing the digital divide. In 2007, she developed the program combining an M.Ed. degree in education and principal training accreditation; titled "School Leadership" (a Ministry of Education pilot program) and headed it until 2009.

In 2004–2005, she headed the Institute for Online Education at Achva Academic College, and between 2005–2010, she headed the Program for School Principal Training at the college. In 2010, she received from the college president the "President's Award" of the highest honor for maintaining teaching excellence over a prolonged period. From 2012 to 2016, she founded and headed the School for Advanced Degrees at Achva, while the School of Education gained the necessary accreditation to be united with the Academic College under the auspices of the Council for Higher Education in Israel and the Planning and Budgeting Committee. In 2016, with Professor Friedman, she developed the thesis track for the M.Ed. program in Educational Administration at Achva Academic College, the sole program in this field in Israel to offer a thesis track. She also advised local authorities on matters of education.

In 2000, she was awarded a tenured position at Achva Academic College of Education; in 2003, she was promoted to senior lecturer; in 2018, she was granted the degree of associate professor.

In 2016, she was appointed rector of Achva Academic College. In February 2019, she resigned to protest a falsified data submitted by the college president, Professor Shosh Arad, and her staff to the Council of Higher Education and actions that violated the council's regulations.

Since 2003, she has been a board member of the FTA-Facet Theory Association, serving as the association's secretary-treasurer in 2010–2013. Since 2006, she has volunteered as a guest lecturer in the IDF "Ofakim" program", initiated by Professor Efrat Kass. Between 2007–2010, she served as the educational advisor to the Minister for Minorities, Avishay Braverman.

During the last five years, she won two significant research grants from the Ministry of Education, and she is researching together with her two colleagues, Prof. Orna Shatz Oppenheimer and Dr. Rinat Arviv-Elyashiv, the unique programs for teacher training in Israel.

Fisher is remarried to Dr. Rafi Fisher, a dentist. She has two daughters and resides in Ramat Aviv.

== Research ==
=== Parental involvement in education ===
Fisher's first research efforts, starting with her doctoral dissertation, dealt with parental involvement in education in Israel. She introduced to the field the concepts of identification and alertness. Her book "There is Another Way" deals with parental involvement and presents the first attestations of successful parental involvement in schools. The book demonstrates how the theoretical models can be converted into a practical work plan that matches the needs of each school. Following the book's publication, she had many opportunities. She delivered frequent lectures to audiences of school principals and educational staff and was invited to advise local authorities on the subject.

Furthermore, she defined the term "parental involvement" according to facet theory and thus created a two-dimensional approach that includes the viewpoint of all partners: parents, teachers, students, and policymakers. She developed several research tools to investigate perceptions of parental involvement. She edited a book about facet theory with Professor Friedman and another on the subject with Professor Paul Hackett.

In addition, she led a joint study with her colleagues in the USA that compared the perception of parental involvement among teacher-education college students. Fisher also revealed connections between parental involvement and other concepts, such as teacher authority and community.

=== School excellence ===
Alongside her research into parental involvement, Fisher has researched the subject of school excellence. She developed a theoretical model for school excellence that was tested and applied in educational institutes. The statistical analysis was based on Professor Louis Gutman's facet theory, which she developed and adapted to the field of education with the help of Prof. Friedman.

The theoretical pyramid model led her to research school excellence by creating success stories, which she has written about along with Dr. Revital Hayman in the book "The Road to Excellence: Schools' Success Stories." Fisher wrote an article focusing on the attributes contributing to school excellence.

The model for school excellence is based on Jim Collins's "Good to Great" The model differentiates between Internal Excellence and External Excellence. Furthermore, beyond renewing the definition of excellence as a concept, the model makes it possible to apply the theory in practice.

=== Teachers' values ===
Fisher also studied teachers' value systems to prepare an ethical code for teachers. Using facet theory, she described teachers' values, which serve as the foundation of their educational work. Up until that point, these values had been described in a one-dimensional way. Her studies showed that the values that motivate teachers are varied.

=== Principal training and self-efficacy ===
Fisher studied the professional self-efficacy of preschool teachers and teachers, principals, and candidates for school management. She was the first to research the professional self-efficacy of aspiring school principals during their training. She researched the field using facet theory combined with conventional statistics. The research highlighted the importance of training novice principals, an outlook adopted by the Avney Rosha Institute. As an expert on principal self-efficacy, the Oxford Encyclopedia of Educational Psychology invited her to write a Dictionary Entry on this topic.

She researched the relationship between teachers' professional self-efficacy and parental involvement, the concept of inclusion, and kindergartens' perceptions of organizational excellence. These studies were conducted using Structural Equation Modelling (SEM). She also wrote about parents' overt and covert motivations for joining parent committees. The statistical analysis was based on facet theory.

== Books published ==
- Fisher, Y. & Hayman, R. (2008). The Road to Excellence—The Stories of Excellent Schools. Jerusalem, Henrietta Szold Institute–the National Institute for Research in the Behavioral Sciences and the Yad Hanadiv Foundation. (Hebrew).
- Fisher, Y. (2010). There is Another Way: Three Success Stories. Tel Aviv, MOFET Institute. (Hebrew).

== Books edited ==
- Fisher, Y., & Friedman A.I (Eds.) (2011). New horizons for facet theory: Interdisciplinary collaboration searching for structure in content spaces and measurement. Tel Aviv: FTA publication. (279 pages).
- Fisher, Y., & Hackett, P. (Eds.) (2019). Advances in Facet Theory Research: Developments in Theory and .Application and Competing Approaches. Lausanne, Switzerland: Frontiers in Psychology

== Additional reading ==
- 2000 Outstanding Intellectuals of 21st Century, International Biographical Centre, Great Britain, 2013, Seventh Edition, p. 199.
- Who'sWho in the world 2008, Marquis Who'sWho, Silver Anniversary, 25th Edition, p. 761.
