= Margaret Cox (academic) =

English physicist

Margaret Josephine Cox OBE
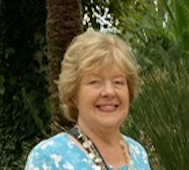
- Born: 17 July 1939 (age 87)
- Education: University of London
- Known for: Research on Dental Education
- Scientific career
- Fields: Physics, Education, Dentistry
- Workplaces: King's College London
- Doctoral advisor: Doug Heddle

Margaret Josephine Cox OBE (born 17 July 1939), is an English physicist known for pioneering the use of information technology in education since the 1970s and more recently (2003 onwards) for her research and development work in the field of Dental Education and haptics in dentistry and healthcare. She is Professor Emeritus of Information Technology in Education in the School of Education, Communication and Society at King's College London and Professor of Information Technology Education in the Faculty of Dentistry, Oral and Craniofacial Sciences at King’s College London.

== Professional life ==
Cox was President of the National Conference of University Professors from January 2013 – 2017. She is an editorial board of member of the journal Education and Information Technologies and an editorial board member of the Journal for Computer Assisted Learning. Cox directed the Schools Council funded Computers in the Curriculum Project from 1982 to 1991.

The hapTEL (haptics in technology-enhanced learning) Project of which Cox was Principal Investigator won the following prizes: the Economic and Social Science Research Council Research Award (2011); Research Project of the Year at King's College London (2012); and the British Education Training and Technology Award (20212).

== Education ==
Margaret Cox was educated at the School of St. Agnes and St. Michael's, East Grinstead (1945–1955) and then at Montesano finishing school in Gstaad, Switzerland (1955–56) where she studied Spanish, Italian, German in the French speaking school. On returning to the UK Margaret Cox attended the School of Modern Languages which was part of Regent Street Polytechnic in London in Autumn of 1956. However, after learning physics from student colleagues she switched to study physics and Maths A-levels so that finally she was accepted onto the BSc in Experimental Physics University of London external degree programme at Regent Street Polytechnic in graduating in 1961 with a BSc. in Experimental Physics. She was awarded the Polytechnic's Percy Abbot Prize for the most outstanding student of the year in 1961 and went on to study for a PhD in Atomic Physics at University College London in 1966.

== Awards and recognition ==
Cox was appointed by Her Majesty the Queen in the 2001 Birthday Honours list as an Officer of the Order of the British Empire for outstanding contributions to IT in Education. She was made a Fellow of the Institute of Physics in 2003 and a Fellow of the Association for Information Technology in Teacher Education (now incorporated into the Technology, Pedagogy and Education Association in 2020). She is a Fellow of the National Conference of University Professors.

== Publications ==
Cox's publications listed on Web of Science give her an h-index of 14.
