= Nomothetic and idiographic =

Philosophical terms used by Windelband

Nomothetic and idiographic are terms used by neo-Kantian philosopher Wilhelm Windelband to describe two distinct approaches to knowledge, each one corresponding to a different intellectual tendency, and each one corresponding to a different branch of academia. To say that Windelband supported that last dichotomy is a consequent misunderstanding of his own thought. For him, any branch of science and any discipline can be handled by both methods as they offer two integrating points of view. They are both different ways of analysing the same concepts, in different perspectives.

- Nomothetic is based on what Kant described as a tendency to generalize. It is typical for the natural sciences. It describes the effort to derive laws that explain types or categories of objective phenomena, in general.
- Idiographic is based on what Kant described as a tendency to specify. It is typical for the humanities. It describes the effort to understand the meaning of contingent, unique, and often cultural or subjective phenomena.

== Use in the social sciences ==
The problem of whether to use nomothetic or idiographic approaches is most sharply felt in the social sciences, whose subject are unique individuals (idiographic perspective), but who have certain general properties or behave according to general rules (nomothetic perspective).

Often, nomothetic approaches are quantitative, and idiographic approaches are qualitative, although the "Personal Questionnaire" developed by Monte B. Shapiro and its further developments (e.g. Discan scale and PSYCHLOPS) are both quantitative and idiographic. Another very influential quantitative but idiographic tool is the Repertory grid when used with elicited constructs and perhaps elicited elements. Personal cognition (D.A. Booth) is idiographic, qualitative and quantitative, using the individual's own narrative of action within situation to scale the ongoing biosocial cognitive processes in units of discrimination from norm (with M.T. Conner 1986, R.P.J. Freeman 1993 and O. Sharpe 2005). Methods of "rigorous idiography" allow probabilistic evaluation of information transfer even with fully idiographic data.

In psychology, idiographic describes the study of the individual, who is seen as a unique agent with a unique life history, with properties setting them apart from other individuals (see idiographic image). A common method to study these unique characteristics is an (auto)biography, i.e. a narrative that recounts the unique sequence of events that made the person who they are. Nomothetic describes the study of classes or cohorts of individuals. Here the subject is seen as an exemplar of a population and their corresponding personality traits and behaviours. It is widely held that the terms idiographic and nomothetic were introduced to American psychology by Gordon Allport in 1937, but Hugo Münsterberg had used them in his 1898 presidential address at the American Psychological Association meeting. This address was published in Psychological Review in 1899.

Theodore Millon stated that when spotting and diagnosing personality disorders, first clinicians start with the nomothetic perspective and look for various general scientific laws; then when they believe they have identified a disorder, they switch their view to the idiographic perspective to focus on the specific individual and his or her unique traits.

In sociology, the nomothetic model tries to find independent variables that account for the variations in a given phenomenon (e.g. What is the relationship between timing/frequency of childbirth and education?). Nomothetic explanations are probabilistic and usually incomplete. The idiographic model focuses on a complete, in-depth understanding of a single case (e.g. Why do I not have any pets?).

In anthropology, idiographic describes the study of a group, seen as an entity, with specific properties that set it apart from other groups. Nomothetic refers to the use of generalization rather than specific properties in the same context.

== See also ==
- Lumpers and splitters
- Nomology
