= Sichuan Medical University =

Sichuan Medical University may refer to:

- Southwest Medical University, briefly known as Sichuan Medical University for less than one year from 2015 to 2016
- West China Medical Center, famously known as Sichuan Medical College from 1953 and 1985
