= Nurse Education in Practice =

- Discipline: Nursing
- Language: English
- Edited by: Roger Watson

Publication details
- History: 2001–present
- Publisher: Elsevier
- Frequency: 8/year
- Impact factor: 3.43 (2021)

Standard abbreviations
- ISO 4: Nurse Educ. Pract.

Indexing
- ISSN: 1471-5953 (print); 1873-5223 (web)
- LCCN: 00213672

Links
- Journal homepage

Nurse Education in Practice is a peer-reviewed nursing journal covering nursing, midwifery, and healthcare education published by Elsevier. It was established in 2001 and its founding editor was Karen Holland. The current editor-in-chief is Roger Watson (Southwest Medical University).

== Abstracting and indexing ==
The journal is abstracted and indexed in:

- Scopus
- MEDLINE/PubMed
- Current Contents/Life Sciences
- CINAHL

According to the Journal Citation Reports, the journal has a 2021 impact factor of 3.43.
