= Faceted =

Faceted may refer to an object containing a facet.

Faceted may also refer to:

- Faceted classification, organizational system allowing multiple characteristics or attributes of each item
- Faceted search, technique for accessing information via faceted classification
- Faceted striking platform

== See also ==
- Facet (disambiguation)
