= Pyrevarians =

Nonexistent social group used in scientific surveys

Pyrevarians are a nonexistent social group used in some psychological and social scientific surveys to measure social distancing of outgroups. The use of a bogus social group assists researchers in exploring theoretical and methodological research problems. Surveys on social distancing, using the Bogardus social distance scale, indicate that Pyrevarians are one of the least accepted social outgroups, demonstrating how ignorance of another group plays a great role in the formation of exclusionary attitudes.

In some surveys, the imaginary group are labeled the Brombinians, or other bogus names to represent an ethnic or national group.

== See also ==
- Social exclusion
- Xenophobia
