= Ideographic approach =

Psychology concept

The ideographic approach refers to the idea in psychology proposed by Marc Brysbaert that the conclusions of a study stay limited to the phenomenon under study. It also focuses on the importance of individual traits when determining behavior instead of group norms. It reinforces the position that the study of the individual is the most effective method of understanding behavior.

== Background ==
A major tradition in behavioral psychology is concerned with the variables and how one's characteristics are abstracted from other people's. The ideographic approach emerged from the position among pioneers in personality psychology that focuses on the study of individuality.

== Methodologies ==
The ideographic approach often use qualitative methodologies in its study of small number of individuals rather than make generalizations out of information collected from a large quantitative database. The methods operate according to the idea that each person is like no other person.

The psychological literature distinguishes ideographic approach from the nomothetic laws, which are concerned with the general perspective.
