= Darwinian poetry =

Web project to evolve poetry similar to natural selection

Darwinian poetry was a web project created in 2003 by David Rea to determine whether "non-negotiated collaboration" could evolve interesting and intelligent poetry using a process akin to natural selection. Visitors to the site were presented with two poems, both arbitrary splicings of two 'parent' poems. The visitor was asked to select the more appealing, and poems that survived the process of voting went on to be spliced into other 'healthy' poems. Unpopular poems eventually "died". The intent was to create, in the long term, poems that were progressively more interesting and sensible.

According to the introduction to the now-defunct site, the poems would, "(i)n all likelihood . . . both be abysmal pieces of nonsensical garbage. That's ok. All you have to do is read them both and pick the one you find more appealing, for whatever reason. Your decision might be based on a single word that you happen to like. It doesn't matter. Just pick whichever one strikes your fancy." The original poems were constructed from a group of 1,000 words selected from such sources as Hamlet and The Iliad. After few years of interbreeding, poems such as the following two began to emerge.

== Poem #18118 (generation 13) ==
the beautiful the frozen
hour of our other lie
temple lost music
just later from
shouting while in doomed nothingness was

== Poem #20014 (generation 17) ==
spent waves sang
beating pointed time and
measureless
with cold knowledge
revealing
one dream is I perhaps love you

A number of widely known publications, including New Scientist and Discover magazine, featured this site.

== See also ==
- Darwinian algorithm
