= National Conference of University Professors =

Organization of University Professors in the UK

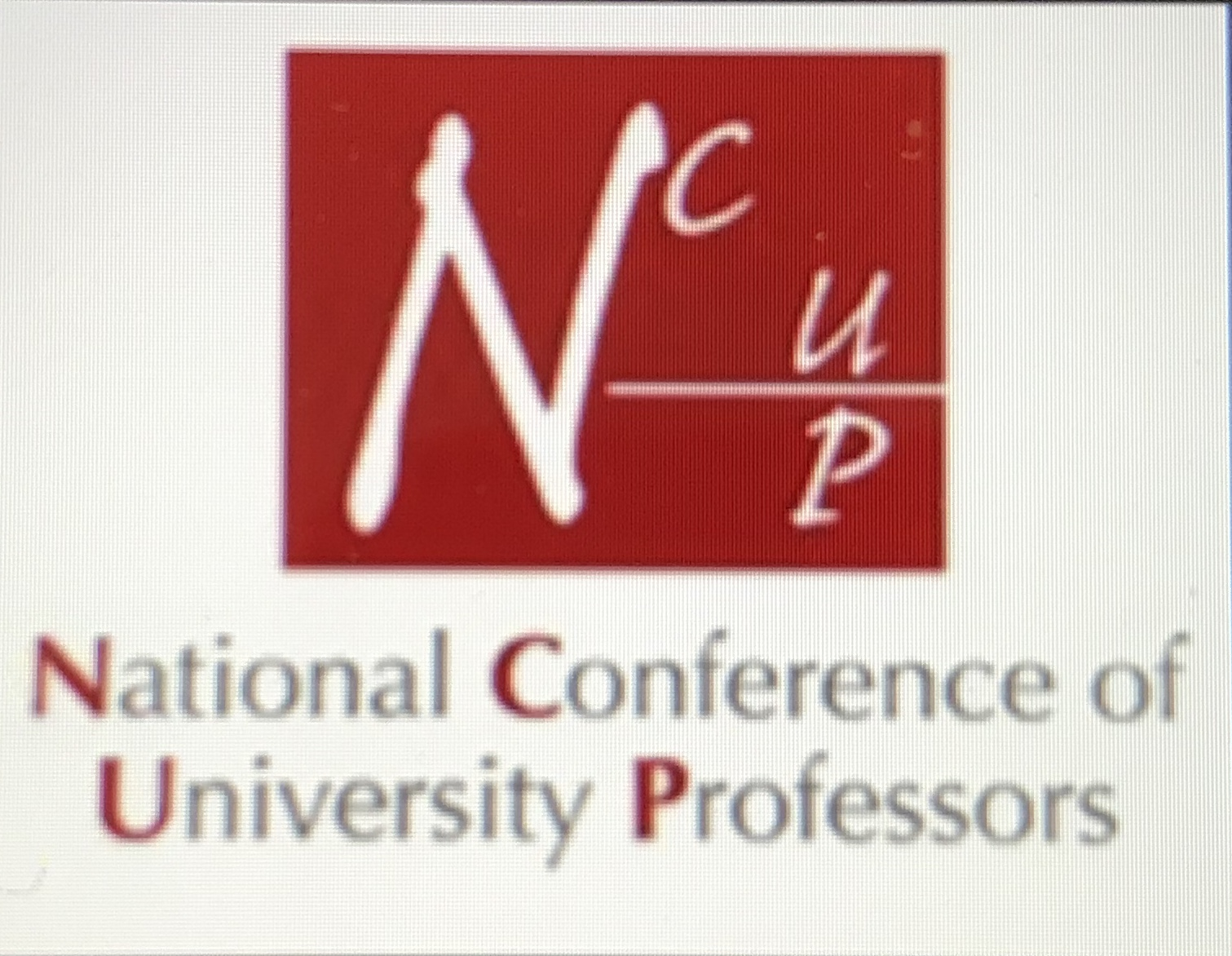
- Formation: 1989
- Type: Charity Number 1180796
- Location: United Kingdom
- Members: Professors, associate professors and senior academics in United Kingdom universities
- Official language: English
- President: Roger Watson
- Website: www.ncup.org.uk

The National Conference of University Professors (NCUP) is an organisation for university professors in the United Kingdom. The past Patron was Pauline Perry, Baroness Perry of Southwark.

NCUP was founded in 1989 by a group of university professors. It is a non-political organisation that aims to promote beneficial developments across United Kingdom universities.

== Membership ==
Members come from all academic disciplines.

According to the membership criteria: 'Full membership is open to all who hold, or have held, the title of Professor, Visiting Professor or Honorary Professor within a recognised University in the United Kingdom for a minimum of one year. It is also open to Professors of a recognised University from overseas, who are now permanently resident in UK.' and 'Applicants eligible to apply for Associate Membership of NCUP (ANCUP) include: 1. All Associate Professors, Readers and Principal and Senior Lecturers of a recognised UK University; 2. Other academics who consider themselves to be of equal standing to any of those above.'

== Leadership ==
Recent presidents have included:

- Thomas Brooke Benjamin (founding president) - mathematician
- Terence Davis - psychometrics
- Janet Wilson (2020–2022) - English and post-colonial studies
- Roger Watson (2022–2024) - nursing
- George Kernohan (2024–present) - health research

The current Vice President is Mike Watts.

== Publications ==
- NCUP (1990) Quality-Control of Teaching Standards
- NCUP (1991) Higher Education: A New Framework
- NCUP (1991) The Role of the Professoriate
- NCUP (1992) Improving Public Opinion of Universities
- NCUP (1993) Commitment to Scholarship and Research in Universities

== See also ==
- American Association of University Professors
