= Nomological network =

Representation of concepts and relationships between concepts

A nomological network (or nomological net) is a representation of the concepts (constructs) of interest in a study, their observable manifestations, and the interrelationships between these. The term "nomological" derives from the Greek, meaning "lawful", or in philosophy of science terms, "law-like". It was Cronbach and Meehl's view of construct validity that in order to provide evidence that a measure has construct validity, a nomological network must be developed for its measure.

The necessary elements of a nomological network are:

- At least two constructs;
- One or more theoretical propositions, specifying linkages between constructs, for example: "As age increases, memory loss increases".
- Correspondence rules, allowing each construct to be measured empirically. Such a rule is said to "operationalize" the construct, as for example in the operationalization: "Age" is measured by asking "how old are you?"
- Empirical linkages represent hypotheses before data collection, empirical generalizations after data collection.

Validity evidence based on nomological validity is a general form of construct validity. It is the degree to which a construct behaves as it should within a system of related constructs (the nomological network).

Nomological networks are used in theory development and use a modernist approach.

== See also ==
- Consilience
- Coherentism
- Nomology
- Knowledge Representation
