= Nomology =

Science of laws in philosophy

In philosophy, nomology refers to a "science of laws" based on the theory that it is possible to elaborate descriptions dedicated not to particular aspects of reality but inspired by a scientific vision of universal validity expressed by scientific laws.

== Etymology ==
"Nomology" derives from the Greek νόμος, law, and λόγος, reason. The term nomology may come from Aristotle. The '-ology' suffix implies 'order', 'word' and 'reason', and is about being subjectively reasonable or 'logical' as in sociology and psychology. The 'nom-' part implies 'rule' and 'law', and is about being objectively lawful or 'nomic' as in economics.

== Nomological networks ==
A nomological approach requires taking account of both subjective and objective aspects in a decision. Nomology provides the framework for building a nomological network of relationships between constructs in decision making.

== See also ==
- Deductive-nomological model
- Nomological determinism
- Nomothetic
