= Thurstone scale =

First formal technique to measure an attitude

In psychology and sociology, the Thurstone scale was the first formal technique to measure an attitude. It was developed by Louis Leon Thurstone in 1928, originally as a means of measuring attitudes towards religion. Today it is used to measure attitudes towards a wide variety of issues. The technique uses a number of statements about a particular issue, and each statement is given a numerical value indicating how favorable or unfavorable it is judged to be. These numerical values are prepared ahead of time by the researcher and not shown to the test subjects. The subjects then check each of the statements with which they agree, and a mean score of those statements' values is computed, indicating their attitude.

== Thurstone scale ==
Thurstone's method of pair comparisons can be considered a prototype of a normal distribution-based method for scaling-dominance matrices. Even though the theory behind this method is quite complex (Thurstone, 1927a), the algorithm itself is straightforward. For the basic Case V, the frequency dominance matrix is translated into proportions and interfaced with the standard scores. The scale is then obtained as a left-adjusted column marginal average of this standard score matrix (Thurstone, 1927b). The underlying rationale for the method and basis for the measurement of the "psychological scale separation between any two stimuli" derives from Thurstone's Law of comparative judgment (Thurstone, 1928). ASU

The principal difficulty with this algorithm is its indeterminacy with respect to one-zero proportions, which return z values as plus or minus infinity, respectively. The inability of the pair comparisons algorithm to handle these cases imposes considerable limits on the applicability of the method.

The most frequent recourse when the 1.00-0.00 frequencies are encountered is their omission. Thus, e.g., Guilford (1954, p. 163) has recommended not using proportions more extreme than .977 or .023, and Edwards (1957, pp. 41–42) has suggested that "if the number of judges is large, say 200 or more, then we might use pij values of .99 and .01, but with less than 200 judges, it is probably better to disregard all comparative judgments for which pij is greater than .98 or less than .02."’ Since the omission of such extreme values leaves empty cells in the Z matrix, the averaging procedure for arriving at the scale values cannot be applied, and an elaborate procedure for the estimation of unknown parameters is usually employed (Edwards, 1957, pp. 42–46). An alternative solution of this problem was suggested by Krus and Kennedy (1977).

With later developments in psychometric theory, it has become possible to employ direct methods of scaling such as application of the Rasch model or unfolding models such as the Hyperbolic Cosine Model (HCM) (Andrich & Luo, 1993). The Rasch model has a close conceptual relationship to Thurstone's law of comparative judgment (Andrich, 1978), the principal difference being that it directly incorporates a person parameter. Also, the Rasch model takes the form of a logistic function rather than a cumulative normal function.

== See also ==
- Thurstonian model – Stochastic transitivity mathematical model
- Bogardus scale – Scale measuring a person's willingness to engage with various types of people
- Guttman scale – Single, ordinal psychometric scale
- Likert scale – Psychometric measurement scale
- Semantic differential – Empirical method used in Linguistics
- Diamond of opposites – Type of plot used in psychodrama groups
