= Nomothetic =

Sociological terminology

Nomothetic literally means "proposition of the law" (Greek derivation) and is used in philosophy, psychology, and law with differing meanings.

== Etymology ==
In the general humanities usage, nomothetic may be used in the sense of "able to lay down the law", "having the capacity to posit lasting sense" (from Ancient Greek: νομοθετικός, romanized: nomothetikós, from νομοθέτης, nomothétēs, 'lawgiver', from νόμος, nómos, 'custom, law' and ultimately Proto-Indo-European: *nem-, lit. 'take, give, account, apportion'), e.g., 'the nomothetic capability of the early mythmakers' or 'the nomothetic skill of Adam, given the power to name things.'

== In psychology ==
In psychology, nomothetic refers to research about general principles or generalizations across a population of individuals. For example, the Big Five model of personality and Piaget's developmental stages are nomothetic models of personality traits and cognitive development respectively. In contrast, the Ideographic approach refers to research about the unique and contingent aspects of individuals, as in psychological case studies.

In psychological testing, nomothetic measures are contrasted to ipsative or idiothetic measures, where nomothetic measures are measures that are observed on a relatively large sample and have a more general outlook.

== In other fields ==
In sociology, nomothetic explanation presents a generalized understanding of a given case, and is contrasted with idiographic explanation, which presents a full description of a given case. Nomothetic approaches are most appropriate to the deductive approach to social research inasmuch as they include the more highly structured research methodologies which can be replicated and controlled, and which focus on generating quantitative data with a view to explaining causal relationships.

In anthropology, nomothetic refers to the use of generalization rather than specific properties in the context of a group as an entity.

In history, nomothetic refers to the philosophical shift in emphasis away from traditional presentation of historical text restricted to wars, laws, dates, and such, to a broader appreciation and deeper understanding.

== See also ==
- Nomothetic and idiographic
- Nomological
