= Discan =

Scale and method in clinical psychology

Discan is both a scale and a method in clinical psychology. The term is a contraction of the words "discretized" and "analog" and is also known as categorical analogue scales.

As a scale, it is a type of ordered-metric scaling that yields a scale with internal reliability, and scale-points in excess of the number of initial anchors, more than would be the case with the Likert scale, though not as many as are achieved by the Analog scale. In Louis Thurstone's tradition, it is scored by paired-comparisons. Seeking optimality, it is a compromise between the competing merits and demerits of the Likert scale and the Analog scale. Its scoring system is a unitary non-transitional scales of severity that may have a maximum 8 or 10.

With the Discan method, four descriptive anchor-levels yield 14 scale-points, or three levels produce ten, representing some of the possible values of intensity of the variable. The method involves a series of repeated comparisons of the true or perceived levels using one or two reference levels.

It was originated, for use in clinical psychology, by M. B. Shapiro. It was developed within a span of six years. The Likert and analog scales—with the implicit assumption about the judgmental process of rating—are considered part of the Discan family.

== See also ==
- Nomothetic
- Idiographic
