= Fast Analog Computing with Emergent Transient States =

Fast Analog Computing with Emergent Transient States or FACETS is a European project to research the properties of the human brain. Established and funded by the European Union in September 2005, the five-year project involves approximately 80 scientists from Austria, France, Germany, Hungary, Sweden, Switzerland and the United Kingdom.

The main project goal is to address questions about how the brain computes. Another objective is to create microchip hardware equaling approximately 200,000 neurons with 50 million synapses on a single silicon wafer. Current prototypes are running 100,000 times faster than their biological counterparts, which would make them the fastest analog computing devices ever built for neuronal computations.

The institutions involved are the University of Heidelberg, the French National Centre for Scientific Research (CNRS) of Gif sur Yvette, the CNRS of Marseille, the Institut national de recherche en informatique et en automatique, the University of Freiburg, the University of Graz, the École Polytechnique Fédérale de Lausanne, the Swedish Royal Institute of Technology, the University of London, the University of Plymouth, the University of Bordeaux, the University of Debrecen, the University of Dresden and the Institute for Theoretical Computer Science at Technische Universitat Graz.
