= Louis Guttman =

Israeli-American mathematician (1916–1987)

Louis (Eliyahu) Guttman
- לואיס גוטמן
- Born: February 10, 1916; New York, New York, U.S.
- Died: October 25, 1987 (aged 71); Minneapolis, Minnesota, U.S.
- Education: University of Minnesota
- Known for: Guttman scale
- Scientific career
- Fields: Social statistics
- Institutions: Cornell University; Hebrew University of Jerusalem
- Thesis: The prediction of quantitative variates by factor analysis (1942)

Louis Guttman (Hebrew: לואיס (אליהו) גוטמן; February 10, 1916 – October 25, 1987) was an American and Israeli sociologist and Professor of Social and Psychological Assessment at the Hebrew University of Jerusalem, known primarily for his work in social statistics.

== Biography ==
Louis (Eliyahu) Guttman was born in New York City and grew up in the Jewish community of Minneapolis, Minnesota. Guttman received both his BA in 1936 and MA in 1939 at the University of Minnesota, and his PhD in Social and Psychological Measurement in 1942. In 1947 Guttman and his wife Ruth immigrated to Palestine.

Guttman died on October 25, 1987, while on sabbatical in Minneapolis.

== Academic career ==
From 1941 to 1947 Guttman was professor of sociology at Cornell University, while as part of the World War II effort, he also served as an Expert Consultant to the US Army's Research Branch.

He founded and was the scientific director of the Israel Institute of Applied Social Research, later renamed the Guttman Institute before finally becoming the Guttman Center for Public Opinion and Policy Research.

He was member of the Israel Academy of Sciences and Humanities, and foreign Honorary member of the American Academy of Arts and Sciences and President of the Psychometric Society. In 1956 he was elected a Fellow at the Center for Advanced Study in the Behavioral Sciences. In 1962 he received the Rothschild Prize. The development of scaling theory by Louis Guttman and Clyde Coombs has been recognized by Science as one of 62 major advances in the social sciences in the period 1900-1965.

== Awards and recognition ==
- 1974 Regents of the University of Minnesota - Outstanding Achievement Award
- 1978 Israel Prize in the social sciences
- 1984 Educational Testing Service Measurement Award from Princeton University.

== Work ==
Guttman research interests were in the fields of scale and factor analysis, multidimensional scaling and facet theory. His mathematical and philosophical treatments of Factor analysis are among the important parts of his scientific legacy.

His earlier work in scaling analysis produced what has become to be known as the Guttman scale. Later, searching for a more flexible scaling scheme, Guttman explored Partial Order Scalogram Analysis (POSA) and applied it in empirical studies. Notably, Guttman first proved several fundamental theorems in matrix algebra, as discussed in papers by Hubert, Meulman and Heiser (2000) and Takane and Yanai (2005). Several of Guttman's contributions, such as Smallest Space Analysis (SSA), have been incorporated into computer packages.

Guttman was described as a brilliant innovator who "saw theory in method and method in theory", was "informed by high sophistication in mathematics, statistics, sociology and psychology", and one who "made a major contribution to democratic policy-making in the new state" and "was concerned with the 'well-being' of individuals, groups and society".

Guttman published in numerous journals and books, including over 300 pages in Psychometrika. Many of his papers are still quoted in the scientific literature as being relevant and important to current statistical and mathematical advances.

His innovative methodological work on attitudes was published in the 4th volume of Studies in Social Psychology in World War II (more popularly called The American Soldier series, after the title of the first two volumes).
