= Diamond of opposites =

Type of plot used in psychodrama groups

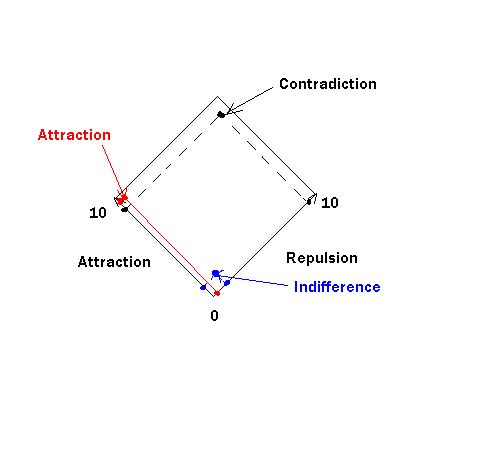
Diamond of opposites

The diamond of opposites is a type of two-dimensional plot used in psychodrama groups. This tool can illuminate the presence of contradictions in processes that cannot be detected by any single questionnaire item using a traditional format such as the Likert scale. The diamond of opposites is a sociometric scaling method that simultaneously measures positive and negative responses to a statement.

Psychodrama/Sociometry: The psychological approach to counseling and exploring issues, both personal and in a wider social context, was founded by J.L. Moreno in the 1920s. His unique approach to therapy and social change at that time involved using theater and roleplay to assist individuals and groups to change/ improve their life circumstances, and a somewhat lesser known approach, called Sociometry, to measuring social dynamics in groups, and effect change in groups and society. Sociometry measures the connections between individuals in any group, from small groups to world issues. Measuring connections and feelings within a group assists individuals within the group to make desired/ needed changes, and also provides a wealth of information about the dynamics in any particular group or situation. The Diamond of Opposites is one type of sociometric assessment.

Unlike traditional question formats, especially the semantic differential format where the respondent must choose a point on a one-dimensional scale anchored by two semantically opposite terms, the diamond of opposites allows the respondent to express attraction and repulsion independently. In this format, the stem describes an object, person or situation in relation to which the respondent is asked to indicate their degree of attraction and repulsion. The two variables are plotted on two orthogonal axes.

== Example ==
mathematics problems

- Indicate your level of attraction on a scale of 1 (low) to 10 (high)
- Indicate your level of repulsion on a scale of 1 (low) to 10 (high)
1. The respondent indicates attraction of x' = 8, and repulsion of y' = 5.
2. The point (x',y') represents the current attitude of the respondent toward mathematics problems.

== See also ==
- Bogardus social distance scale
- Cognitive dissonance
