= Bogardus social distance scale =

Scale measuring a person's willingness to engage with various types of people

The Bogardus social distance scale is a psychological testing scale created by Emory S. Bogardus to empirically measure people's willingness to participate in social contacts of varying degrees of closeness with members of diverse social groups, such as racial and ethnic groups.

The scale asks people the extent to which they would be accepting of each group (a score of 1.00 for a group is taken to indicate no social distance):

- As close relatives by marriage (i.e., as the legal spouse of a close relative) (score 1.00)
- As my close personal friends (2.00)
- As neighbors on the same street (3.00)
- As co-workers in the same occupation (4.00)
- As citizens in my country (5.00)
- As non-citizen visitors in my country (6.00)
- Would exclude from entry into my country (7.00)

The Bogardus social distance scale is a cumulative scale (a Guttman scale), because agreement with any item implies agreement with all preceding items.

Research by Bogardus first in 1925 and then repeated in 1946, 1956, and 1966 shows that the extent of social distancing in the US is decreasing slightly and fewer distinctions are being made among groups. The study was also replicated in 2005. The results supported the existence of this tendency, showing that the mean level of social distance has been decreasing comparing with the previous studies.

For Bogardus, social distance is a function of affective distance between the members of two groups: ‘‘[i]n social distance studies the center of attention is on the feeling reactions of persons toward other persons and toward groups of people.’’ Thus, for him, social distance is essentially a measure of how much or little sympathy the members of a group feel for another group.

== Criticisms ==
- The assumption of a universally applicable ordering of options and, with it, the assumption of its implication that rankings are interpersonally comparable lead to the following potential problems:

- First, individual options within the scale may be insufficiently refined, with the effect that a respondent's ordering of options may be different for different subtypes of one or more options presented as undifferentiated.

- For example, given a respondent's personal history of differing power relationships with different types of close family members, a respondent might consider him/herself bound to accept a divorced or widowed parent's choice to marry a member of a disfavored group while being indifferent toward the prospect of a sibling's marrying a member of that group and objecting to the prospect of a child's marrying a member of that group.

- In addition, differing levels of attachment to different immediate-family members may prompt different responses: A respondent who believes associating with members of a given group to be detrimental might simultaneously a) object to the prospect of a group member's marriage to an immediate family member for whom the respondent retains strong affection, b) be indifferent to or grudgingly accept that group member's marriage to an immediate family member with whom the respondent has little contact, and c) welcome the supposed harm that the respondent anticipates that marriage to that group member will inflict on an immediate family member toward whom the respondent bears animosity.

- Second, the cumulative status of the scale as presented is vulnerable to individual, subcultural, and cultural differences in the relative positions of these items, as well as to changes in those orderings since the scale's development.

- Differences in the ordering of these items decrease the inter-rater reliability of any individual survey conducted at a given time.

- For example, an individual who is estranged from his or her close family members may care less about whom they marry than about who is in his or her circle of close friends, and a respondent whose poor social skills and/or social anxiety limit the respondent's ability to initiate friendships may welcome anyone who comes the respondent's way despite that person's membership in a group disfavored by the respondent.

- The larger the number of persons who place these items in different orders, the less strongly representative of the community is the ordering favored by a majority or plurality of surveyed individuals. This problem includes but is not limited to the "salad bowl" multicultural scenario in which subsets of a given overall community are internally relatively homogeneous but retain characteristics that distinguish them from other subsets of that overall community.

- The longer the time interval between surveys in a series, the more vulnerable cross-temporal surveys are to changes in the ordering that constitutes the metric used to evaluate a given survey's results and the changes between successive surveys.

- For example, in cultures in which average social interaction between members of the same geographic community has decreased since the scale's development (as studies such as Robert Putnam's "Bowling Alone" have suggested with respect to the U.S.), a significant number of persons may interact more with their co-workers than with their physical neighbors, and for these people a disfavored group member's presence in the same workplace may be more objectionable than that member's residence on the same street would be.

- Likewise, especially for younger generations, whose members are on average more geographically mobile than were their elders at a comparable age, a significant number of persons may interact more with their friends, co-workers, and/or neighbors than with their siblings-, parents-, and/or children-in-law, with the effect that a respondent may envision him/herself being less bothered on a daily basis by having a disfavored group member as a relative-in-law than s/he would by having that individual as a co-worker or neighbor. In addition, a respondent who prefers not to associate with members of certain groups but respects others' freedom of association may accept a close relative's choice of a disfavored group member as a spouse even when that respondent would refuse to consider choosing the group member to be one of his or her own close friends.

- Third, the assumption of an equal difference in quantitative social distance between the various options complicates any effort at generalization and/or comparison, whether in intrapersonal or interpersonal comparisons and whether for time-specific, longitudinal, or intervalic surveys.

- For example, if a respondent considers the difference in social distance between "3" and "4" to be more or less than the difference between "5" and "6," it would likely be inaccurate to infer that a disfavored group at level "6" is twice as distant as a disfavored group at level "3," and even if two respondents agree on the quantitative level of distance associated with each option, it would be inaccurate to average a "2" response from one and a "6" response from the other as a "4."

- This difficulty is compounded when different individuals assign different absolute levels of distance to, and with them different absolute amounts of difference between, given options in the scale.

- Bogardus’s conceptualization is not the only one in the sociological literature. Several sociologists have pointed out that social distance can also be conceptualized on the basis of other parameters such as the frequency of interaction between different groups or the normative distinctions in a society about who should be considered an "insider" or "outsider."
- The scale has been criticized as oversimplified because social interactions and attitudes in close familial or friendship-type relationships may for at least some persons be qualitatively different from social interactions with and attitudes toward relationships with far-away contacts such as citizens or visitors in one's country.

== See also ==
- Minimal group paradigm
- Guttman scale
- Likert scale
- Thurstone scale
- Diamond of opposites
- Social distance
- Pyrevarians
