= Southwest Medical University =

University in Luzhou, Sichuan, China

- 西南医科大学
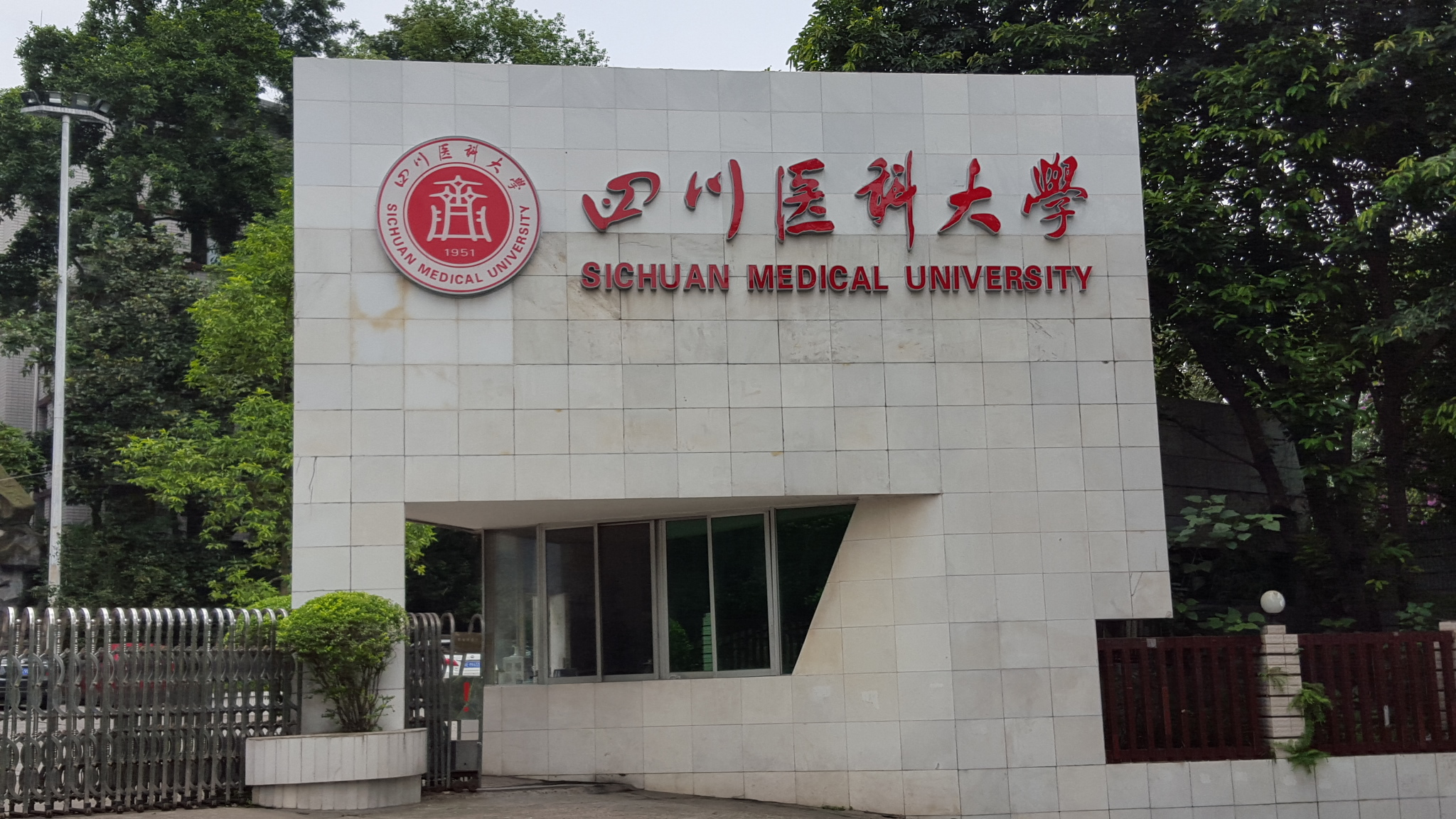
- Type: Public
- Established: 1951
- President: He Yanzheng (何延政)
- Students: ~15,000
- Location: Luzhou, Sichuan, China
- Website: swmu.edu.cn

Southwest Medical University (SWMU; Chinese: 西南医科大学), formerly Luzhou Medical College (泸州医学院), is a public medical university in the city of Luzhou, Sichuan, China.

== History ==
The school was first established in 1951 as Southern Sichuan Doctors' School (川南医士学校). In 1958, the school was renamed as Luzhou Specialist School of Medicine (泸州医学专科学校). In 1978, it was authorized to grant bachelor's degrees and changed its name to Luzhou Medical College (泸州医学院).

In 2015, Luzhou Medical College was authorized to change its name to Sichuan Medical University (四川医科大学). However, the well-known West China Medical Center of Sichuan University, which was famously known as "Sichuan Medical College" (四川医学院) from 1953 and 1985, protested that the new name was too similar to its former name. In 2016, the school changed its name again to Southwest Medical University.
