= Solo status =

Social psychology term

Solo status is a social psychology term first popularized by Lord and Saenz (1985), to classify the situation when only one member of a particular social category (race, gender, culture) is present in a group setting. While the term has been used interchangeably with "token", solo status "does not imply that a person has been preferentially selected for a position by virtue of his or her social category", but is the singular representative based on mere chance or circumstance.

As the only member from the particular social category, individuals (especially women and minorities) frequently feel a sense of responsibility to properly represent their entire category, with fear of not perpetuating a negative stereotype. This self-censoring places a greater strain on the individual's cognitive resources, leading to poorer performance on the task. Solo status can impact a person's performance even without the direct reference or relation to a stereotype, in spite of the person having equal or higher education or training than the remaining group.

== Field vs. laboratory results ==
The field of psychology is consistently confronted with the struggle of ecological validity and the applicability of their laboratory research in the real world. Due to the methods of testing solo status in both the field and the lab, psychologists’ understanding of solo status has evolved over time. Lord and Saenz (1985) completed the first solo status experiment in a lab, where they claimed that solo status was equally detrimental to men and women on their cognitive performance. Unfortunately, these results did not align with Yoder's and Aniakudo's (1997) findings that women who experienced solo status in their offices were negatively affected in their job performances and productivity when compared to their male counterparts. Due to the discrepancies found in the research, Sekaquaptewa and Thompson (2002) compared the differences in methods and determined that laboratory studies focused on solo status’ impact on the learning task, while field studies focused on the task performance. The primary findings on the studies’ approach is explored below:

=== Laboratory cases ===
Using Lord and Sanez (1985), as the primary case, participants were required to engage in a conversation with individuals online after receiving solo status during the learning phase. The article found that solo status individuals recalled less of the discussion, with the memory loss being justified by the participant splitting their attention between focusing on how they are portraying themselves and the material being learned. Lord and Sanez (1985), found no difference between gender and race. These results were supported by Cohen and Swim (1995) and Stangor, Carr, and Kiang (1998) who found a mirroring trend.

=== Field cases ===
In field studies, individuals were reminded of their solo status during the performance task, where they become the sole focus of the group. In these studies, the individual had to speak in front of a group or engage in discussions. Based on these studies, a differing level of solo status has been demonstrated between high-status and low-status individuals. Low status individuals are often concerned that a negative performance will reflect poorly on their social category, while high status individuals do not share this concern.

== Impact on high-status individuals ==
In most cases, white males are classified as the high-status due to the privilege men receive in society. Due in part to this privilege, white males do not show any implications of solo status in field cases. In fact, Heikes (1991) found that white male nurses who experienced solo status reported a positive experience and were privy to special treatment that frequently lead to an earlier promotion than their female counterparts.

== Impact on low-status individuals ==
In psychological studies, low-status individuals are represented by women or minorities (ethnic or race), who consistently perform worse in recall or when answering questions in group situations. Kanter (1977) found that observers remembered what solo status individuals' stated better than nonsolos, and were judged more critically than their majority counterparts. These critical judgments were worsened by the circumstance, as solo status is most frequently seen in contexts that impact the solo status individuals' social and economic welfare.
