= Generality =

Generality may be:

- The assumption of Generality, a concept in psychology

A generality or generalty is a word used during the Ancien Régime in France and other Western European countries to indicate a specific territory under direct rule of central government (as opposed to a "particularity", which was the government of established provinces or principalities). These include:

- Généralité (France)
- Generaliteitslanden or Generality Lands (Netherlands)
- Generalitat (Spain)
  - Generalitat de Catalunya, or Government of Catalonia
  - Generalitat Valenciana, or Governmental of Valencia
