= Cue recruitment =

Form of learning illusions

Cue recruitment is a form of associative learning in human perception. A cue in perception is a signal that can be measured by an observer's perceptual system, that is informative about the state of some property of the world. A trusted cue is one that the system utilizes to construct appearance, i.e. to build a percept (what one "sees") that depends on the world state. In a cue recruitment experiment, an arbitrarily chosen signal is put into correlation with trusted cues, which makes the signal into an artificial cue. If the artificial cue acquires the ability to affect appearance in a manner similar to the trusted cues, it is said to have been recruited.

The cue recruitment experiment is a form of classical conditioning experiment, the simplest test for associative learning in which one (or at most a few) new signal(s) are put into correlation with one or a few trusted cues. Cue recruitment (a change in perceptual appearance) does not always occur during a cue recruitment experiment.

Perceptually bistable stimuli are often used to test for cue recruitment because they allow the experimenter to measure very small cue-contingent biases in appearance. Bistable stimuli are useful for a second reason as well: trainees can easily report appearance for these stimuli. As a result, if learning occurs during the experiment, the experimenter can be sure that the learning caused a change in how the stimulus looked, rather than a change in the explicit strategy used by the trainee during responding.

Cue recruitment is one of many types of cue learning, a more general framework due to Egon Brunswik that also encompasses other adaptive changes in the system's use of cues. Examples of cue learning that are not cue recruitment include:

- Cue weighting. When two or more trusted cues are available to estimate the same property of the world, human perceptual systems usually exhibit data fusion, and it is possible to change the relative weights given to different cues through training (Ernst et al., 2000).
- Pattern learning. A complex pattern of signals can be learned to act as a cue that affects appearance (Sinha & Poggio, 1996).
- Recalibration. The way that a particular cue is utilized can be modified by experience (Adams et al., 2001).

== Example ==
Cue recruitment was demonstrated by Haijiang et al. (2006) using a computer-generated rotating Necker cube stimulus. This stimulus is perceptually bistable and may appear to rotate either left or right. To test for cue recruitment, binocular disparity cues (3D cues) were added to the Necker cube, to specify which part of the cube was in front and which was in back. The apparent direction of rotation was thereby brought under experimenter control. The new cue was that the cube moved upward or downward on every trial (contingent on its direction of rotation). Test trials contained the new cue but not the trusted cue. On these trials, trainees tended to see the cube rotating in the same direction it had during training (depending on whether its motion was upward or downward).

== External links and references ==
- Adams, Banks, and van Ee (2001). Adaptation to three-dimensional distortions in human vision. Nature Neuroscience, 4: 1063–1064.
- Backus (2011). Recruitment of new visual cues for perceptual appearance. Chapter 6 (pp. 101–119) in: Sensory Cue Integration. Edited by Trommershäuser, Körding, and Landy. Oxford University Press.
- Ernst, Banks, and Bulthoff (2000). Touch can change visual slant perception. Nature Neuroscience, 3: 69–73.
- Haijiang, Saunders, Stone and Backus (2006). Demonstration of cue recruitment: Change in visual appearance by means of Pavlovian conditioning. Proc. Natl. Acad. Sci. USA, 103: 483–488.
- Sinha and Poggio (1996). Role of learning in three-dimensional form perception. Nature, 384: 460–463.
