= Virtual reality cue reactivity =

Computer-enhanced methodology

Virtual Reality Cue Reactivity (VRCR) is a computer-enhanced methodology used to assess behavioral and physiological reactivity to drug and alcohol sensory cues. Studies indicate that cue reactivity—a response to the presentation of various visual, auditory, olfactory, and tactile cues—increases physiological excitement in addicts. VRCR utilizes virtual reality (VR) technology to stimulate cue reactivity in the most efficient and realistic environments possible; the intention being that coping skills can be taught in a contextual scenario that reflect a real world situation. While still in the early stages of development, studies have shown that VRCR is an effective means of generating a craving-inspiring environment that is tempting to a patient suffering from addiction.

== Use in addiction ==
Studies have indicated that cue exposure in patients is closely related to increases in physiological responses. In addition, situational cues are also a leading cause in triggering relapse. People suffering from addiction have a tendency to attribute their addiction to specific scenarios or events. For example, a smoker might have a habit of only smoking on his porch. Consequently, whenever he is near or around his porch, he connects it to smoking, and a craving is initiated by the mere proximity. This is an example of the classical conditioning theory, which describes how a specific cue can trigger an entirely separate reaction.

One of the most effective ways to avoid patient relapse is to instruct them on coping skills—ideally in the most detrimental cue exposure settings possible. The idea being that if patients can learn to deny their cravings in a controlled environment, denial in a real world environment will be easier. Virtual reality helps to emulate a near lifelike situation, complete with sights, sounds, smells, and movement.

== How it works ==
In order to create a lifelike environment, actors are filmed on a green screen doing many various activities such as smoking cigarettes, dancing, drinking alcohol, doing drugs, and other provocative actions. The actors are then integrated into a three-dimensional background, giving the impression that they are in a real environment. Virtual reality (VR) technology allows a user to be immersed in a computer-simulated environment by engaging the senses of a human body. As of now, visual and auditory are the two most common senses appealed to when creating a VR environment—mainly because they use simpler technologies that are much cheaper to develop. However, advances in technology are allowing for a much more efficient way to appeal to the olfactory senses as well.

=== Visual senses ===
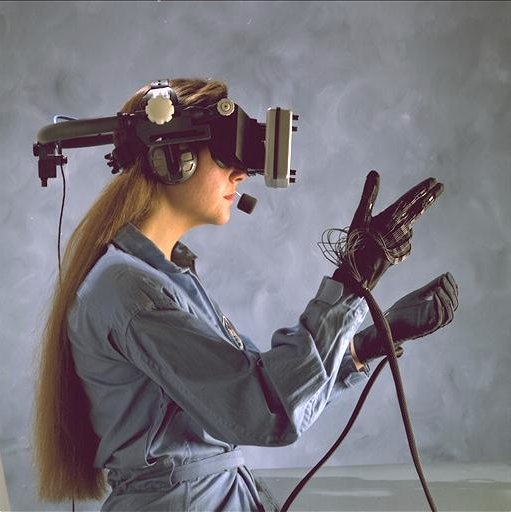
A head mounted display (HMD) being used at NASA.

Arguably the most important facet in making a virtual environment seem real is an appeal to sight. A virtual reality headset, incorporating a head-mounted display (HMD) is placed in front of the eyes of a patient like a pair of sunglasses, enabling for complete visual attention. A virtual environment is then displayed. A system of motion sensors tracks movement of the patient's head. If the patient tilts, or turns his head to view another part of the room, the environment adjusts accordingly. This allows for a more realistic experience by limiting restrictions of the head.

=== Auditory senses ===
A headset is placed around the ears of a patient that allows for sound to be heard. Generally, full surround-sound is desirable as it gives the patient a sense of space. For example, if a virtual person standing in front of the patient was speaking, the voice would be clear and audible. However, if a virtual person was standing to the left or right of the patient, the sound would be much quieter and muffled. Surround sound aids in giving a lifelike feeling to the VR environment.

=== Olfactory senses ===
Olfactory cues are presented by a computer-controlled device that releases scents in accordance with a patient's virtual environment. The device has multiple chambers with different scents in each, and uses an air compressor to blow specific scents into a patient's testing area. For example, if the patient were to approach a table with marijuana on it, he would also smell marijuana in real life. Other important scents used in VRCR include vanilla, pizza, coffee, whiskey, cigarette smoke, beer, and pine trees. The use of olfactory stimulation allows for a much more realistic virtual environment.

== Clinical use ==
VR technology has been slowly gaining acceptance in a clinical environment. It is used for treating specific phobias, pain management, eating disorders, and post-traumatic stress disorder. Studies have indicated that, "patients reported emotional and physiological arousal when immersed in VR, thus providing a tool for exposure in the treatment of psychological disorders". VR technology also allows for a standardized testing environment that could greatly increase patient recovery rates.

== Evolution ==
In the past, cue reactivity has been used in labs to instruct patients in beneficial coping skills that help them to avoid relapse. Virtual reality technology allows for a more effective approach to trigger physiological arousal than the standard cue reactivity methods used previously—primarily, presentation of paraphernalia or actor-based simulation.

=== Cue reactivity ===
Presentation of paraphernalia works by presenting a patient with physical items relative to their respective addiction. For example, a person who drinks excessive amounts of alcohol might have a bottle of liquor placed in front of her, and a marijuana addict, a pipe. However, despite the fact that the objects are real, the environment in which they are presented is far from realistic. Learning how to turn down substances in a lab setting is much different than turning them down at an actual party—thus, the instructional process is limited.

=== Actor-based simulation ===
Another means of establishing a realistic situation is through actor-based simulation. Actors are hired, and stages are built to simulate what an actual situation might be like. Patients are able to interact with the actors in a realistic manner. While extremely lifelike and effective, efficiency is a major disadvantage. The actors are subject to availability, and must be paid for their services. Furthermore, stages are limited to constructed scenes that are not easy to change. Though more effective than standard presentation cue response, actor-based simulation is still limited.

=== Virtual reality technology ===
Virtual reality cue reactivity, though still in an early stage of development, is aimed at becoming a much more efficient version of an actor-based simulation. The goal is to produce a system that will virtually simulate a given scenario while still allowing a patient to interact with the surroundings. The advantages include increased flexibility—an operator has the ability to produce virtually any scenario needed—as well as cheaper running costs because actors are no longer needed. The procedure is also much more accessible as actor availability is irrelevant.
