= Basic category =

Cognitive psychology concept

In cognitive psychology, a basic category is a category at a particular level of the category inclusion hierarchy (i.e., a particular level of generality) that is preferred by humans in learning and memory tasks. The term is associated with the work of psychologist Eleanor Rosch, who demonstrated basic category preferences in a number of classic experiments.
