= Cue validity =

Cue validity is the conditional probability that an object falls in a particular category given a particular feature or cue. The term was popularized by Beach (1964), Reed (1972) and especially by Eleanor Rosch in her investigations of the acquisition of so-called basic categories (Rosch & Mervis 1975;Rosch 1978).

== Definition of cue validity ==
Formally, the cue validity of a feature $f_i\$ with respect to category $c_j\$ has been defined in the following ways:

- As the conditional probability $p(c_j|f_i)\$; see Reed (1972), Rosch & Mervis (1975), Rosch (1978).
- As the deviation of the conditional probability from the category base rate, $p(c_j|f_i)-p(c_j)\$; see Edgell (1993), Kruschke & Johansen (1999).
- As a function of the linear correlation; see Smedslund (1955), Castellan (1973), Sawyer (1991), Busemeyer, Myung & McDaniel (1993).
- Other definitions; see Restle (1957), Martignon et al. (2003).

For the definitions based on probability, a high cue validity for a given feature means that the feature or attribute is more diagnostic of the class membership than a feature with low cue validity. Thus, a high-cue validity feature is one which conveys more information about the category or class variable, and may thus be considered as more useful for identifying objects as belonging to that category. Thus, high cue validity expresses high feature informativeness. For the definitions based on linear correlation, the expression of "informativeness" captured by the cue validity measure is not the full expression of the feature's informativeness (as in mutual information, for example), but only that portion of its informativeness that is expressed in a linear relationship. For some purposes, a bilateral measure such as the mutual information or category utility is more appropriate than the cue validity.

== Examples ==
As an example, consider the domain of "numbers" and allow that every number has an attribute (i.e., a cue) named "is_positive_integer", which we call $f_{p\mbox{-}int}\$, and which adopts the value 1 if the number is actually a positive integer. Then we can inquire what the validity of this cue is with regard to the following classes: {rational number, irrational number, even integer}:

- If we know that a number is a positive integer we know that it is a rational number. Thus, $p(c_{rational}|f_{p\mbox{-}int}) = 1\$, the cue validity for is_positive_integer as a cue for the category rational number is 1.
- If we know that a number is a positive integer then we know that it is not an irrational number. Thus, $p(c_{irrational}|f_{p\mbox{-}int}) = 0\$, the cue validity for is_positive_integer as a cue for the category irrational number is 0.
- If we know only that a number is a positive integer, then its chances of being even or odd are 50-50 (there being the same number of even and odd integers). Thus, $p(c_{even}|f_{p\mbox{-}int}) = 0.5\$, the cue validity for is_positive_integer as a cue for the category even integer is 0.5, meaning that the attribute is_positive_integer is entirely uninformative about the number's membership in the class even integer.

In perception, "cue validity" is often short for ecological validity of a perceptual cue, and is defined as a correlation rather than a probability (see above). In this definition, an uninformative perceptual cue has an ecological validity of 0 rather than 0.5.

== Use of the cue validity ==
In much of the work on modeling human category learning, there has been the assumption made (and sometimes validated) that attentional weighting tracks the cue validity, or tracks some related measure of feature informativeness. This would imply that attributes are differently weighted by the perceptual system; informative or high-cue validity attributes being weighted more heavily, while uninformative or low-cue validity attributes are weighted more lightly or ignored altogether (see, e.g., Navarro 1998).
