= Category utility =

Measure of "category goodness"

Category utility is a measure of "category goodness" defined in Gluck & Corter (1985) and Corter & Gluck (1992). It attempts to maximize both the probability that two objects in the same category have attribute values in common, and the probability that objects from different categories have different attribute values. It was intended to supersede more limited measures of category goodness such as "cue validity" and "collocation index". It provides a normative information-theoretic measure of the predictive advantage gained by the observer who possesses knowledge of the given category structure (i.e., the class labels of instances) over the observer who does not possess knowledge of the category structure. In this sense the motivation for the category utility measure is similar to the information gain metric used in decision tree learning. In certain presentations, it is also formally equivalent to the mutual information, as discussed below. A review of category utility in its probabilistic incarnation, with applications to machine learning, is provided in Witten and Frank's 2005 book.

== Probability-theoretic definition of category utility ==
The probability-theoretic definition of category utility given in Fisher (1987) and Witten and Frank (2005) is as follows:

$$CU(C,F) = \tfrac{1}{p} \sum_{c_j \in C} p(c_j) \left [\sum_{f_i \in F} \sum_{k=1}^m p(f_{ik}|c_j)^2 - \sum_{f_i \in F} \sum_{k=1}^m p(f_{ik})^2\right ]$$

where $F = \{f_i\}, \ i=1 \ldots n$ is a size-$n\$ set of $m\$-ary features, and $C = \{c_j\} \ j=1 \ldots p$ is a set of $p\$categories. The term $p(f_{ik})\$designates the marginal probability that feature $f_i\$ takes on value $k\$, and the term $p(f_{ik}|c_j)\$ designates the category-conditional probability that feature $f_i\$ takes on value $k\$ given that the object in question belongs to category $c_j\$.

The motivation and development of this expression for category utility, and the role of the multiplicand $\textstyle \tfrac{1}{p}$ as a crude overfitting control, is given in the above sources. Loosely, the term $\textstyle p(c_j) \sum_{f_i \in F} \sum_{k=1}^m p(f_{ik}|c_j)^2$ is the expected number of attribute values that can be correctly guessed by an observer using a probability-matching strategy together with knowledge of the category labels, while $\textstyle p(c_j) \sum_{f_i \in F} \sum_{k=1}^m p(f_{ik})^2$ is the expected number of attribute values that can be correctly guessed by an observer the same strategy but without any knowledge of the category labels. Their difference therefore reflects the relative advantage accruing to the observer by having knowledge of the category structure.

== Information-theoretic definition of category utility ==
The information-theoretic definition of category utility for a set of entities with size-$n\$ binary feature set $F = \{f_i\}, \ i=1 \ldots n$, and a binary category $C = \{c,\bar{c}\}$ is given in Gluck & Corter (1985) as follows:

$$CU(C,F) = \left [p(c) \sum_{i=1}^n p(f_i|c)\log p(f_i|c) + p(\bar{c}) \sum_{i=1}^n p(f_i|\bar{c})\log p(f_i|\bar{c}) \right ] - \sum_{i=1}^n p(f_i)\log p(f_i)$$

where $p(c)\$ is the prior probability of an entity belonging to the positive category $c\$ (in the absence of any feature information), $p(f_i|c)\$ is the conditional probability of an entity having feature $f_i\$ given that the entity belongs to category $c\$, $p(f_i|\bar{c})$ is likewise the conditional probability of an entity having feature $f_i\$ given that the entity belongs to category $\bar{c}$, and $p(f_i)\$ is the prior probability of an entity possessing feature $f_i\$ (in the absence of any category information).

The intuition behind the above expression is as follows: The term $p(c)\textstyle \sum_{i=1}^n p(f_i|c)\log p(f_i|c)$ represents the cost (in bits) of optimally encoding (or transmitting) feature information when it is known that the objects to be described belong to category $c\$. Similarly, the term $p(\bar{c})\textstyle \sum_{i=1}^n p(f_i|\bar{c})\log p(f_i|\bar{c})$ represents the cost (in bits) of optimally encoding (or transmitting) feature information when it is known that the objects to be described belong to category $\bar{c}$. The sum of these two terms in the brackets is therefore the weighted average of these two costs. The final term, $\textstyle \sum_{i=1}^n p(f_i)\log p(f_i)$, represents the cost (in bits) of optimally encoding (or transmitting) feature information when no category information is available. The value of the category utility will, in the above formulation, be non-negative.

=== Category utility and mutual information ===
Gluck and Corter (1985) and Corter and Gluck (1992) mention that the category utility is equivalent to the mutual information. Here is a simple demonstration of the nature of this equivalence. Assume a set of entities each having the same $n$ features, i.e., feature set $F = \{f_i\}, \ i=1 \ldots n$, with each feature variable having cardinality $m$. That is, each feature has the capacity to adopt any of $m$ distinct values (which need not be ordered; all variables can be nominal); for the special case $m=2$ these features would be considered binary, but more generally, for any $m$, the features are simply m-ary. For the purposes of this demonstration, without loss of generality, feature set $F$ can be replaced with a single aggregate variable $F_a$ that has cardinality $m^n$, and adopts a unique value $v_i, \ i=1 \ldots m^n$ corresponding to each feature combination in the Cartesian product $\otimes F$. (Ordinality does not matter, because the mutual information is not sensitive to ordinality.) In what follows, a term such as $p(F_a=v_i)$ or simply $p(v_i)$ refers to the probability with which $F_a$ adopts the particular value $v_i$. (Using the aggregate feature variable $F_a$ replaces multiple summations, and simplifies the presentation to follow.)

For this demonstration, also assume a single category variable $C$, which has cardinality $p$. This is equivalent to a classification system in which there are $p$ non-intersecting categories. In the special case of $p=2$ there are the two-category case discussed above. From the definition of mutual information for discrete variables, the mutual information $I(F_a;C)$ between the aggregate feature variable $F_a$ and the category variable $C$ is given by:

$$I(F_a;C) = \sum_{v_i \in F_a} \sum_{c_j \in C} p(v_i,c_j) \log \frac{p(v_i,c_j)}{p(v_i)\,p(c_j)}$$

where $p(v_i)$ is the prior probability of feature variable $F_a$ adopting value $v_i$, $p(c_j)$ is the marginal probability of category variable $C$ adopting value $c_j$, and $p(v_i,c_j)$ is the joint probability of variables $F_a$ and $C$ simultaneously adopting those respective values. In terms of the conditional probabilities this can be re-written (or defined) as

$$\begin{align}
I(F_a;C) & = \sum_{v_i \in F_a} \sum_{c_j \in C} p(v_i,c_j) \log \frac{p(v_i|c_j)}{p(v_i)} \\
& = \sum_{v_i \in F_a} \sum_{c_j \in C} p(v_i|c_j)p(c_j) \left [\log p(v_i|c_j)- \log p(v_i) \right ] \\
& = \sum_{v_i \in F_a} \sum_{c_j \in C} p(v_i|c_j)p(c_j) \log p(v_i|c_j)- \sum_{v_i \in F_a} \sum_{c_j \in C} p(v_i|c_j)p(c_j) \log p(v_i) \\
& = \sum_{v_i \in F_a} \sum_{c_j \in C} p(v_i|c_j)p(c_j) \log p(v_i|c_j)- \sum_{v_i \in F_a} \sum_{c_j \in C} p(v_i,c_j) \log p(v_i) \\
& = \sum_{v_i \in F_a} \sum_{c_j \in C} p(v_i|c_j)p(c_j) \log p(v_i|c_j)- \sum_{v_i \in F_a} \log p(v_i) \sum_{c_j \in C} p(v_i,c_j) \\
& = \sum_{v_i \in F_a} \sum_{c_j \in C} p(v_i|c_j)p(c_j) \log p(v_i|c_j)- \sum_{v_i \in F_a} p(v_i) \log p(v_i) \\
\end{align}$$

If the original definition of the category utility from above is rewritten with $C = \{c,\bar{c}\}$,

$$CU(C,F) = \sum_{f_i \in F} \sum_{c_j \in C} p(f_i|c_j) p(c_j) \log p(f_i|c_j) - \sum_{f_i \in F} p(f_i) \log p(f_i)$$

This equation clearly has the same form as the (blue) equation expressing the mutual information between the feature set and the category variable; the difference is that the sum $\textstyle \sum_{f_i \in F}$ in the category utility equation runs over independent binary variables $F = \{f_i\}, \ i=1 \ldots n$, whereas the sum $\textstyle \sum_{v_i \in F_a}$ in the mutual information runs over values of the single $m^n$-ary variable $F_a$. The two measures are actually equivalent then only when the features $\{f_i\}$, are independent (and assuming that terms in the sum corresponding to $p(\bar{f_i})$ are also added).

== Insensitivity of category utility to ordinality ==
Like the mutual information, the category utility is not sensitive to any ordering in the feature or category variable values. That is, as far as the category utility is concerned, the category set {small,medium,large,jumbo} is not qualitatively different from the category set {desk,fish,tree,mop} since the formulation of the category utility does not account for any ordering of the class variable. Similarly, a feature variable adopting values {1,2,3,4,5} is not qualitatively different from a feature variable adopting values {fred,joe,bob,sue,elaine}. As far as the category utility or mutual information are concerned, all category and feature variables are nominal variables. For this reason, category utility does not reflect any gestalt aspects of "category goodness" that might be based on such ordering effects. One possible adjustment for this insensitivity to ordinality is given by the weighting scheme described in the article for mutual information.

== Category "goodness": models and philosophy ==
This section provides some background on the origins of, and need for, formal measures of "category goodness" such as the category utility, and some of the history that lead to the development of this particular metric.

=== What makes a good category? ===
At least since the time of Aristotle there has been a tremendous fascination in philosophy with the nature of concepts and universals. What kind of entity is a concept such as "horse"? Such abstractions do not designate any particular individual in the world, and yet we can scarcely imagine being able to comprehend the world without their use. Does the concept "horse" therefore have an independent existence outside of the mind? If it does, then what is the locus of this independent existence? The question of locus was an important issue on which the classical schools of Plato and Aristotle famously differed. However, they remained in agreement that universals did indeed have a mind-independent existence. There was, therefore, always a fact to the matter about which concepts and universals exist in the world.

In the late Middle Ages (perhaps beginning with Occam, although Porphyry also makes a much earlier remark indicating a certain discomfort with the status quo), however, the certainty that existed on this issue began to erode, and it became acceptable among the so-called nominalists and empiricists to consider concepts and universals as strictly mental entities or conventions of language. On this view of concepts—that they are purely representational constructs—a new question then comes to the fore: "Why do we possess one set of concepts rather than another?" What makes one set of concepts "good" and another set of concepts "bad"? This is a question that modern philosophers, and subsequently machine learning theorists and cognitive scientists, have struggled with for many decades.

=== What purpose do concepts serve? ===
One approach to answering such questions is to investigate the "role" or "purpose" of concepts in cognition. Thus the answer to "What are concepts good for in the first place?" by Mill and many others is that classification (conception) is a precursor to induction: By imposing a particular categorization on the universe, an organism gains the ability to deal with physically non-identical objects or situations in an identical fashion, thereby gaining substantial predictive leverage. As J.S. Mill puts it,

The general problem of classification... [is] to provide that things shall be thought of in such groups, and those groups in such an order, as will best conduce to the remembrance and to the ascertainment of their laws... [and] one of the uses of such a classification that by drawing attention to the properties on which it is founded, and which, if the classification be good, are marks of many others, it facilitates the discovery of those others.

From this base, Mill reaches the following conclusion, which foreshadows much subsequent thinking about category goodness, including the notion of category utility:

The ends of scientific classification are best answered when the objects are formed into groups respecting which a greater number of general propositions can be made, and those propositions more important, than could be made respecting any other groups into which the same things could be distributed. The properties, therefore, according to which objects are classified should, if possible, be those which are causes of many other properties; or, at any rate, which are sure marks of them.

One may compare this to the "category utility hypothesis" proposed by Corter and Gluck in 1992: "A category is useful to the extent that it can be expected to improve the ability of a person to accurately predict the features of instances of that category." Mill here seems to be suggesting that the best category structure is one in which object features (properties) are maximally informative about the object's class, and, simultaneously, the object class is maximally informative about the object's features. In other words, a useful classification scheme is one in which category knowledge can be used to accurately infer object properties, and property knowledge can be used to accurately infer object classes. One may also compare this idea to Aristotle's criterion of counter-predication for definitional predicates, as well as to the notion of concepts described in formal concept analysis.

=== Attempts at formalization ===
A variety of different measures have been suggested with an aim of formally capturing this notion of "category goodness," the best known of which is probably the "cue validity". Cue validity of a feature $f_i\$ with respect to category $c_j\$ is defined as the conditional probability of the category given the feature, $p(c_j|f_i)\$, or as the deviation of the conditional probability from the category base rate, $p(c_j|f_i)-p(c_j)\$. Clearly, these measures quantify only inference from feature to category (i.e., cue validity), but not from category to feature, i.e., the category validity $p(f_i|c_j)\$. Also, while the cue validity was originally intended to account for the demonstrable appearance of basic categories in human cognition—categories of a particular level of generality that are evidently preferred by human learners—a number of major flaws in the cue validity quickly emerged in this regard. (and others)

One attempt to address both problems by simultaneously maximizing both feature validity and category validity was made by Jones (1983) in defining the "collocation index" as the product $p(c_j|f_i) p(f_i|c_j)\$, but this construction was fairly ad hoc. The category utility was introduced as a more sophisticated refinement of the cue validity, which attempts to more rigorously quantify the full inferential power of a class structure. As shown above, on a certain view the category utility is equivalent to the mutual information between the feature variable and the category variable. It has been suggested that categories having the greatest overall category utility are those that are not only those "best" in a normative sense, but also those human learners prefer to use, e.g., "basic" categories. Other related measures of category goodness are "cohesion" and "salience".

== Applications ==
- Category utility is used as the category evaluation measure in the popular conceptual clustering algorithm called COBWEB.

== See also ==
- Abstraction
- Concept learning
- Universals
- Unsupervised learning
