= Perceptual system =

Computational system which reacts to stimuli

A perceptual system is a computational system (biological or artificial) designed to make inferences about properties of a physical environment based on scenes.

In this context, a scene is defined as sensory information that can flow from a physical environment into a computational system via sensory transduction. A sensory organ (biological or artificial) is used to capture this information. Therefore, a perceptual system must incorporate input from at least one sensory organ.

Examples of perceptual systems include:

- The visual system
- The auditory system
- The olfactory system
- The somatosensory system
- A bat's sonar/echolocation system
- A man-made light meter
- A man-made motion detector

Research in the field of perceptual systems focuses on computational aspects of perception. For this reason, there is significant overlap with neuroscience, sensor design, natural scene statistics, and computer science.
