= Scene (perception) =

Information available to sensory systems

In the field of perception, a scene is information that can flow from a physical environment into a perceptual system via sensory transduction.

A perceptual system is designed to interpret scenes.

Examples of scenes include

- Still images
- Binocular still images
- Moving images (movies)
- Binocular moving images (~3D movies)
- Sounds of a local environment (audio recordings)
- Tactile properties of a local environment.

A natural scene is a scene that a perceptual system would typically encounter in a natural mode of operation. Therefore, a very relevant area of research is natural scene statistics.
