= Generality (psychology) =

Concept in behavioral psychology

In behavioral psychology, the assumption of generality is the assumption that the results of experiments involving schedules of reinforcement, conducted on non-human subjects (often pigeons), can be generalized to apply to humans. If the assumption holds, many aspects of daily human life can be understood in terms of these results. The naturalization of sunlight helps our bodies to stay awake and keep motivated. The darkness that comes with night tells our body to slow down for the day and get some rest. The ability to survive comes with generality. Experiments have been done to test inescapability and insolubility.

Fergus Lowe has questioned the generality of schedule effects in cases of fixed-interval performance among humans and non-humans.

The ability to generalize information from one situation to another is a function of several factors: the reliability of the original information; the paradigm's validity; one's understanding of the paradigm, the true determinants of the behavior, and the relevant details of the situations in question; and the similarity between the original source of the data and the situation to which it is to be applied.

There are both similarities and differences between the terms "stimulus generalization" and "generality of a functional relationship." Stimulus generalization is the description of the fact that an organism behaves in a similar way to similar stimuli, and that the more different the stimuli, the more different the behavior. The generality of a finding refers to the degree to which a functional relationship obtained in one situation is able to predict the obtained relationship in a new situation.

"Generality" refers more to functional relationships than individual events. That responses occur to X about the same as to Z is irrelevant; rather, that distributed practice helps in learning nonsense syllables and in learning other tasks.
