= Egon Brunswik =

Psychologist

Egon Brunswik Edler von Korompa (Austrian German: [ˈbrʊnsvɪk]; 18 March 1903 – 7 July 1955) was a psychologist who is known for his theory of probabilistic functionalism and his proposition that representative design is essential in psychological research.

== Life ==
=== Early life and education ===
Brunswik was born in Budapest, Austria-Hungary. He graduated from the Theresianische Akademie in 1921, after studying mathematics, science, classics, and history. He spent two years (1921–1923) studying engineering at the Vienna Technische Hochschule. He then passed the first required state examination, but then decided to enroll as a student of psychology at the University of Vienna. Student colleagues included Paul F. Lazarsfeld and Konrad Lorenz. While in Vienna he was influenced by Moritz Schlick and the Vienna Circle of logical positivists. While a graduate student in psychology, he also passed the state examination for Gymnasium teachers in mathematics and physics. He received his PhD in 1927 and became an assistant in Karl Bühler's Psychologisches Institut.

=== Early career ===
Brunswik established the first psychological laboratory in Turkey while he was a visiting lecturer in Ankara during 1931–1932. He became Privatdozent at the University of Vienna in 1934. In 1933, Edward C. Tolman, chairman of the department of psychology at the University of California, spent a year in Vienna. He and Brunswik found that although they had been working in different areas of psychological research, their theories of behavior were complementary.

=== Berkeley ===
Brunswik met Tolman in Vienna in 1933. In 1935-1936, a Rockefeller fellowship enabled him to visit the University of California, Berkeley. Thereafter, he remained at Berkeley, where he became an assistant professor of psychology in 1937 and a full professor in 1947.

=== Later life ===
On June 6, 1938, in New York City Brunswik married Else Frenkel-Brunswik (also a former assistant in Buhler's institute), who became well known as a psychoanalytically oriented psychologist and investigator of the authoritarian personality. Also in 1938, he participated in the International Committee set up to organise the International Congresses for the Unity of Science. Brunswik became an American citizen in 1943. After a long and painful bout of severe hypertension, Brunswik died by suicide in Berkeley, California, in 1955.

== Professional contributions ==
=== Probabilistic functionalism ===
Brunswik's work in Vienna had culminated in the publication of Wahrnehmung und Gegenstandswelt in 1934. All of his subsequent work was devoted to the extension and elaboration of the fundamental position set forth in this book, namely, that psychology should give as much attention to the properties of the organism's environment as it does to the organism itself. He asserted that the environment with which the organism comes into contact is an uncertain, probabilistic one, however lawful it may be in terms of physical principles. Adaptation to a probabilistic world requires that the organism learn to employ probabilistic means to achieve goals and learn to utilize probabilistic, uncertain evidence (proximal cues) about the world (the distal object). His probabilistic functionalism was the first behavioral system founded on probabilism. It is represented pictorially by his lens model. He also created the term ecological validity.

=== History of psychology ===
Brunswik wrote a great deal about the history of psychology. His historical analysis is remarkable for its development in structural terms rather than in the customary longitudinal recapitulation of names, dates, and places. It consists of a general identification of the kinds of variables that have traditionally been employed in psychological theory and research and a description of the changes in the emphasis of these variables over time. Brunswik's theory stems as much from his analysis of the history of psychology as it does from his research.

=== Representative design ===
His historical as well as his theoretical analysis also led him to criticize orthodox methods of experimental design, particularly the "rule of one variable" and to suggest methods for avoiding what he believed to be an unfortunate artificiality inherent in classical experimental procedure that do not represent the multiple variables and complexities of the environment. He proposed representative design as an alternative to standard experimental methods.

=== Other work ===
Brunswik's main field of empirical research was perception, but he also brought his probabilistic approach to bear on problems of interpersonal perception, thinking, learning, and clinical psychology. His research findings were published in Perception and the Representative Design of Experiments (1947), which also includes Brunswik's methodological innovations and related research by others.

A feature of Brunswik's work is its coherence. Each theoretical, historical, and research paper is explicitly and tightly integrated with every other one. Brunswik's cast of mind compelled him to fit together with precision his conceptual framework, his methodology, and his views of the history of psychology. In 1952, he presented an overview of the field of psychology in The Conceptual Framework of Psychology.

== Reception and legacy ==
According to Tolman "Brunswik's untimely death on 7 July 1955, at the age of 52, came just as his doctrines of functionalistic achievement, representative design and ecological validity had begun to arouse widespread attention both in this country and abroad." But the extent of his direct influence on psychology remains uncertain.

Brunswik's probabilism is attracting increasing attention in the fields of learning, thinking, decision processes, perception, communication and the study of curiosity. Brunswik's emphasis on the importance of the environment is reflected in the increasing development of psychological ecology.

The application of his ideas in decision analysis has helped improve the decisions of experts in a variety of fields including cancer prognosis, oil trading, and evaluation of candidates for graduate schools or employment. A specific, practical method for the application for Brunswik's models have been documented in the book How to Measure Anything: Finding the Value of Intangibles in Business by Douglas Hubbard.

== Bibliography ==
- Brunswik, Egon (1934). Wahrnehmung und Gegenstandswelt: Grundlegung einer Psychologie vom Gegenstand her. F. Deuticke.
- Brunswik, Egon (April 1937). "Psychology as a Science of Objective Relations". Philosophy of Science. 4 (2): 227–260. doi:10.1086/286455. JSTOR 184864. S2CID 121832879.
- Brunswik, Egon (May 1943). "Organismic Achievement and Environmental Probability". Psychological Review. 50 (3): 255–272. doi:10.1037/h0060889.
- Brunswik, Egon (1952). The conceptual framework of psychology. Vol. 1. University of Chicago Press. pp. IV, 102. ISBN 9780226575858.
- Brunswik, Egon (May 1955). "Representative Design and Probabilistic Theory in a Functional Psychology". Psychological Review. 62 (3): 193–217. doi:10.1037/h0047470. PMID 14371898.
- Brunswik, Egon (1956). Perception and the Representative Design of Psychological Experiments (second ed.). University of California Press.

== See also ==
- Attention
- Decision making
- Functional psychology
