= Manipulation (psychology) =

Exploitative type of social influence

In psychology, manipulation is defined as a deliberate action that aims to influence or control another person in an underhanded or subtle manner which facilitates one's personal motives. Methods someone may use to manipulate another person may include seduction, suggestion, coercion, and blackmail. Manipulation is generally considered a dishonest form of social influence as it is used at the expense of others. Humans are inherently capable of manipulative and deceptive behavior, with the main differences being that of specific personality characteristics or disorders.

== Etymology ==
The term derives from manipule, meaning "handful", a unit of measure used by pharmacists, later having a sense by 1828 of handling or managing people for one's own purposes. The word manipulate originated in 1827 as a back-formation from manipulation, initially meaning "to handle skillfully by hand." By 1864, its usage had expanded to include the figurative sense of "to manage or influence, especially for one's own advantage." The word is used in various different senses, but today it is most often used in psychological contexts.

== Differentiation ==
Manipulation differs from general influence and persuasion. Manipulation, unlike persuasion, typically involves exploiting the vulnerabilities of an individual. Non-manipulative influence is generally perceived to be harmless and it is not seen as unduly coercive to the individual's right of acceptance or rejection of influence. Persuasion is the ability to move others to a desired action, usually within the context of a specific goal. Persuasion often attempts to influence a person's beliefs, religion, motivations, or behavior. Influence and persuasion are neither viewed as positive nor negative, unlike manipulation which is viewed as negative.

== Elements of manipulation ==
While the motivations for manipulation are mostly self-serving, certain styles of social influence can be intended to be to the benefit of others. Manipulation can be defined as the use of strategies to further personal driven goals at the expense of others and is usually considered antisocial behavior. Pro-social behavior is a voluntary act intended to help or benefit another individual or group of individuals and is an important part of empathy.

Manipulative behavior is fundamentally deliberate and intentional, with the manipulator knowing full well the consequences of their actions, and what they want out of the person being manipulated.

Different measures of manipulativeness focus on different aspects or expressions of manipulation and tend to paint slightly different pictures of its predictors. Features such as low empathy, high narcissism, use of self-serving rationalizations, and an interpersonal style marked by high agency (dominance) and low communion (i.e. cold-heartedness) are consistent across measures.

A study by Buss, et al. explored how individuals use manipulation to shape their environments to fit their personal characteristics. Across two studies, researchers identified six main manipulation tactics: charm, silent treatment, coercion, reason, regression, and debasement. These tactics were consistent across different situations, with charm commonly used to initiate behavior and coercion or silent treatment used to stop it. The use of these tactics was linked to personality traits such as Neuroticism, Extraversion, and Agreeableness, and was consistent across self-reports and observer ratings. Another paper investigated the link between one's personality and social processes, and it concluded that "persons are not passive recipients of environmental presses" and that "persons actively avoid some social situations and selectively enter others", and that people "elicit and manipulate the social behavior of persons who reside in situations that have been selected."

Another study by Buss aimed to achieve three primary objectives, to identify the manipulation tactics commonly employed in close interpersonal relationships; to empirically examine the extent to which these tactics are general or specific across different relationship types, including romantic partners, friends, and parents; and to explore the associations between the use of manipulation tactics and the Big Five personality traits. Twelve distinct manipulation tactics were identified through separate factor analyses of two instruments derived from different data sources. These included six tactics Charm, Reason, Coercion, Silent Treatment, Debasement, Regression, and six additional tactics: Responsibility Invocation, Reciprocity, Monetary Reward, Pleasure Induction, Social Comparison, and Hardball (the latter encompassing threats, deception, and aggression). Personality traits were assessed using three sources of data: self-reports, spouse reports, and evaluations by independent interviewers. The findings revealed consistent associations between personality dimensions and manipulation strategies. Specifically, Surgency was linked to Coercion and Responsibility Invocation; Desurgency to Debasement; Agreeableness to Pleasure Induction; Disagreeableness to Coercion; Conscientiousness to Reason; Emotional Instability to Regression; and Intellect-Openness to Reason.

A family study of high-school students and their parents investigated the origin of individual differences in manipulation tactics. The results indicated significant familial aggregation of manipulation tactics, as shown by parent–offspring correlations and midparent–offspring regressions. While manipulation tactics were linked to low Agreeableness and high Neuroticism from the Five-Factor Model, personality traits played a minor role in explaining their selection and use.

Manipulative behavior can occur in a variety of outlets, such as on the internet. Researchers and pundits have expressed concern for the ability of technology to manipulate the opinions and actions of people. Scholars have discussed the potential modern technologies have to affect the autonomy of an individual. The concept has spawned an extensive literature within the field of psychology, and other disciplines interested in human behavior. Cambridge Analytica was under scrutiny for collecting personal data belonging to millions of Facebook users for political advertising without informed consent.

=== In popular psychology ===
Harriet B. Braiker identified the following ways that manipulators control their victims, with some of them including positive reinforcement, which includes praise, superficial charm, superficial sympathy (crocodile tears), excessive apologizing or forced laugh or smile. According to psychology author George K. Simon, successful psychological manipulation primarily involves the manipulator: Simon states that manipulative individuals may use a variety of deceptive techniques to exert control or avoid accountability. Methods include lying by commission, lying by omission, pretending to be in denial, rationalization, selective inattention/selective attention, and diversion. Martin Kantor advises in his 2006 book The Psychopathology of Everyday Life: How Antisocial Personality Disorder Affects All of Us that vulnerability to psychopathic manipulators can be due to being too dependent on others, having a lack of maturity, being naïve, impressionable, trusting, impulsive, altruistic, or greedy.

== Assessment tools ==
=== MACH-IV ===
Manipulativeness is a primary feature found in the Machiavellianism construct. The MACH-IV, conceptualized by Richard Christie and Florence Geis, is a popular and widely used psychological measure of manipulative and deceptive behavior.

=== Emotional manipulation scale ===
The emotional manipulation scale is a ten-item questionnaire developed in 2006 through factor analysis, primarily to measure one's tendency to use emotions to their advantage in controlling others. At the time of publication, emotional intelligence assessments did not specifically examine manipulative behavior and were instead predominantly focused on Big Five personality trait assessment.

=== Managing the emotions of others scale ===
The "Managing the Emotions of Others Scale" (MEOS) was developed in 2013 through factor analysis to measure the ability to change emotions of others. The survey questions measure six categories: mood (or emotional state) enhancement, mood worsening, concealing emotions, capacity for inauthenticity, poor emotion skills, and using diversion to enhance mood. The enhancement, worsening and diversion categories have been used to identify the ability and willingness of manipulative behavior. The MEOS has also been used for assessing emotional intelligence, and has been compared to the HEXACO model of personality structure, for which the capacity for inauthenticity category in the MEOS was found to correspond to low honesty-humility scores on the HEXACO.

=== The SD3 and the Dirty Dozen ===
The dark triad Dirty Dozen and the Short Dark Triad (SD3 or simply D3) also measures a callous, manipulative, self oriented style.

=== Other measures ===
There are several measures that assess interpersonally manipulative characteristics. Measures of psychopathy and narcissism have their own subscales that address manipulation. Other examples include the Honesty-Humility subscale on the HEXACO model of personality, the Agreeableness factor in the Big Five personality test, and on certain factors of the MMPI.

== In mental disorders ==
=== Personality disorders ===
Manipulative behavior is cited as one factor contributing to the reluctance of some psychiatric professionals to work with individuals diagnosed with personality disorders (PDs). Many times this behavior can elicit strong negative emotional reactions, potentially hindering effective care and treatment.

Manipulative tendencies may derive from cluster B personality disorders such as narcissistic personality disorder, antisocial personality disorder, and borderline personality disorder. Manipulative behavior has also been related with one's level of emotional intelligence. Discussion of manipulation may vary depending on which behavior is specifically included, and whether one is referring to the general population or in clinical contexts.

Under the ICD-11 classification of personality disorders, personality disorder is diagnosed dimensionally based on severity levels, with trait qualifiers providing additional specification in regards to how the pathology manifests itself. One of these is Dissociality, of which the aspect lack of empathy is characterized by deceitful, manipulative and exploitative behaviors.

==== Antisocial personality disorder ====
Antisocial personality disorder features deceit and manipulation of others as an explicit criterion. This includes behaviors from lying and superficial displays of charisma to frequent use of aliases and disguises, and criminal fraudulence. The related syndrome of psychopathy also features pathological lying and manipulation for personal gain, as well as superficial charm, as cardinal features.

The Alternative DSM-5 model for personality disorders (AMPD) in Section III of DSM-5 requires the presence of manipulative behavior for a diagnosis of ASPD, with two symptoms (deceitfulness and manipulativeness) reflecting such tendencies out of the seven listed, with six being required for diagnosis (the others are impulsivity, irresponsibility, risk-taking, callousness and hostility). The related syndrome of psychopathy also features pathological lying and manipulation for personal gain, as well as superficial charm, as cardinal features.

Paul Hofer interpreted manipulation to be a psychological defense in regards to those who are affected by their antisocial personality. Paul Babiak views manipulation to be a core feature in how those with high psychopathic traits behave in the workplace.

==== Borderline personality disorder ====
Borderline personality disorder is unique in the grouping as "borderline" manipulation is characterized as unintentional and dysfunctional manipulation. Marsha M. Linehan has stated that people with borderline personality disorder often exhibit behaviors which are not truly manipulative, but are erroneously interpreted as such. According to Linehan, these behaviors often appear as unthinking manifestations of intense pain, and are often not so deliberate as to be considered truly manipulative. In the DSM-5, manipulation was removed as a defining characteristic of borderline personality disorder.

==== Narcissistic personality disorder ====
Narcissistic personality disorder is characterized by a belief of superiority, exhibitionism, self-centeredness and a lack of empathy. Individuals with NPD can be charming but also show exploitive behaviors in the interpersonal domain. They are motivated by success, beauty, and may have feelings of entitlement. Those with this disorder often engage in assertive self enhancement and antagonistic self-protection.

=== Other disorders ===
Conduct disorder is the appearance of antisocial behavior occurring in children and adolescents. Individuals with this disorder are characterized by a lack of empathy, a low sense of guilt, and shallow emotionality. Aggression and violence are two factors that characterize individuals with this disorder. In order for a child to be diagnosed with this disorder, the behavior must be consistent for at least 12 months.

Factitious disorder is a mental illness in which individuals purposely fake having symptoms of some condition, physically or psychologically. Fabricating illnesses allows individuals to feel a thrill and receive free aid in hospital admissions and treatment. Feelings of persistence, abuse in early childhood, and excessive thoughts were common for these individuals who connected to Borderline Personality Disorder.

== See also ==
- Brainwashing – Methods that purportedly control a person's will, desire, or knowledge
- Culture of fear – Arrangement in which fear of retribution is pervasive
- Scam, also known as Confidence trick – Attempt to defraud a person or group
- Crowd manipulation – Branch of social psychology
- Dark triad – Offensive personality types
- Deception – Causing someone to believe something that is not true
- Emotional blackmail – Negative form of psychological control over another
- Fearmongering – Deliberate use of fear-based tactics
- Gaslighting – Type of psychological manipulation
- Gaslight (1944 film) – 1944 American film by George Cukor
- Half-truth – Deceptive statement
- Internet manipulation – Manipulation of digital technology
- List of confidence tricks
- Lie – Intentionally false statement made to deceive
- Media manipulation – Techniques in which partisans create an image that favours their interests
- Propaganda – Communication used to influence opinion
- Psychological warfare – Information operations to assist military objectives
