= Personality development =

Theories on the development of personality

Personality development encompasses the dynamic construction and deconstruction of integrative characteristics that distinguish an individual in terms of interpersonal behavioral traits. Personality development is ever-changing and subject to contextual factors and life-altering experiences. Personality development is also dimensional in description and subjective in nature. That is, personality development can be seen as a continuum varying in degrees of intensity and change. It is subjective in nature because its conceptualization is rooted in social norms of expected behavior, self-expression, and personal growth. The dominant viewpoint in personality psychology indicates that personality emerges early and continues to develop across one's lifespan. Adult personality traits are believed to have a basis in infant temperament, meaning that individual differences in disposition and behavior appear early in life, potentially before language of conscious self-representation develop. The Five Factor Model of personality maps onto the dimensions of childhood temperament. This suggests that individual differences in levels of the corresponding personality traits (neuroticism, extraversion, openness to experience, agreeableness, and conscientiousness) are present from young ages.

== Theories ==
The development of personality is supported and attempted to be explained by theories of personality.

=== Psychoanalytic ===
The Psychoanalytic Theory of personality was developed by Sigmund Freud. This theory consists of three main ideas that make up personality, the id, the ego, and the superego. The three traits each control different aspects of the psyche. Personality develops through the conflict among these components, as described in the Psychoanalytic theory. Id is ruled mainly by pleasure, innate needs, impulses, and desires. Usually, many of these are unrealistic. Our ego is what keeps us sane. It brings into perspective reality, cultural norms, and social acceptance and analyses our id desires and wants to be more realistically correct. Our superego aims for perfection and structure. It is often referenced to as our "conscience." These three play a part in the way we live, think, and our personality.

=== Trait ===
The Trait Theory of personality is one of the main theories in the study of personality. According to this theory, traits make up personality. Traits can be described as patterns of behavior, thought, or emotion. Some commonly accepted trait theories are the Big Five personality traits and the HEXACO model of personality structure. Generally, strong correlations are seen in the levels of any given personality trait in an individual when they are retested several years later. Traits tend to become more stable after young adulthood, and changes in these traits often follow some noticeable trends with age. For example, the trait Honesty-Humility is typically seen to decrease during teenage years, then steadily rise as the individual ages. The trait conscientiousness is generally seen to increase with age, however, the level of the facet perfectionism stays fairly consistent.

=== Social cognitive ===
The social cognitive theory of personality views personality development in terms of reciprocal interactionism, that is, a perspective that considers the relationship of person-society as an interactive system that defines and molds personal development. Personal interaction with other individuals, society, and nature create experiences in which self-identification is organized in relation to social environment. In other words, personality traits are a function of complex cognitive strategies used to effectively maneuver through social situations. Furthermore, according to the social-cognitive perspective, cognitive processes are central to an individual's unique expression of personality traits and affective processes. Through cognitive mechanism and social competencies, individuals interpret contextual situations to derive beliefs that guide their thoughts and behaviors, thus developing an enduring pattern of personality traits.

=== Evolutionary ===
The evolutionary theory of personality development is primarily based on the evolutionary process of natural selection. From the evolutionary perspective, evolution resulted in variations of the human mind. Natural selection refined these variations based on their beneficence to humans. Due to human complexity, many opposing personality traits proved to be beneficial in a variety of ways. Primitive humans were collectivists due to tribe culture. The personalities of individuals within a tribe were very similar. The division of labor resulted in differentiation in personality traits in order to achieve a higher efficiency. Differentiation in personality traits increased functionality, therefore becoming adaptive through natural selection. Humans continued to develop personality and individuality through evolution.

=== Lifespan ===
Classic theories of personality include Freud's tripartite theory and post-Freudian theory (developmental stage theories and type theories) and indicate that most personality development occurs in childhood, stabilizing by the end of adolescence. Current lifespan perspectives that integrate theory and empirical findings dominate the research literature. The lifespan perspectives of personality are based on the plasticity principle, the principle that personality traits are open systems that can be influenced by the environment at any age. Large-scale longitudinal studies have demonstrated that the most active period of personality development appears to be between the ages of 20–40. Although personality grows increasingly consistent with age and typically plateaus near age 50, personality never reaches a period of total stability.

=== Humanistic ===
Humanistic psychology emphasizes individual choices as voluntary actions that ultimately determine personal development. Individual personalities traits, although essential to the integrated self, are only parts that make up the whole of observable human experiences. Thus, personality development is articulated in terms of purposeful action geared towards experiencing mastery of free choice. Rather than compartmentalized elements of personality traits such as feelings, thoughts, or behavior, Humanistic psychology integrates these elements as functions of being in a greater encompassing system such as societies, cultures, or interpersonal relationships. Consequently, personality development is subjected to shifts in personal meaning and individual goals of achieving an ideal self.

== Influencing factors ==
Personality traits demonstrate moderate levels of continuity, smaller but still significant normative or mean-level changes, and individual differences in change, often late into the life course. This pattern is influenced by genetic, environmental, transactional, and stochastic factors.

=== Genetics ===
Genetics can have an impact on one's development of personality. Genes are passed on from one generation to the next and contain characteristics of one's being. Personality can be influenced through many genes acting together. These genes can be huge indicators especially in the temperament and even certain psychiatric disorders in people. There is strong evidence provided in what Gestel and Broeckhoven write on the matter that certain disorders such as attention deficit hyperactivity disorder or ADHD and even substance dependence are heavily influenced and determined by our genetics. We can continue looking at the connection between personality and our genes through the many study methods brought about through behavioral genetics that make the connection clearer. Behavioral genetics refers to the results of adoption studies and twin studies.

Adoption Studies: Genetics are not very highly correlated with adoptive families and their personalities. Studies have been performed comparing adoptive siblings in a family to those who were biological siblings. A correlation of p=0.05 was found between the personalities of biological siblings and of other family members. Adoptive siblings had a correlation of p=0.04 between their personalities and the others' in the family. This shows that there is no supporting evidence for genetic differences in personality in relation to a common environment. Similar correlations were associated with parents and their adoptive children compared to their biological children.

Twin Studies: Genetics can have an influence on twins with identical twins sharing 100% of their genes and fraternal twins sharing, on average, 50%. Genetics can have a big effect on the development of personality, as can be seen in the personality similarities of twins. Studies have shown that identical twins' personalities are more similar than those of nonidentical twins. Identical twins have a correlation of about 40%. Differences in sex have not shown to have any influence on gene heritability or on individual personality.

Twin and adoption studies have demonstrated that the heritability of personality traits ranges from 0.3 to 0.6, with a mean of 0.5, indicating that 50% of variation in observable personality traits is attributable to genetic influences. In contrast, family and adoption studies have demonstrated a low heritability factor. An IAT (implicit association test) on German women has found a connection between specific neurotransmitters and the predisposition for certain personality traits, such as anxiety or extraversion. With the effects of genetic similarity removed, children from the same family often appear no more alike than randomly selected strangers; yet, identical twins raised apart are nearly as similar in personality as identical twins raised together. These findings suggest that shared family environment has virtually no effect on personality development, and that similarity between relatives is almost entirely due to shared genetics.

Personality Development for Students: A Comprehensive Guide

=== Environmental ===
The weakness of shared environmental effects in shaping personality surprised many psychologists, spurring research into non-shared environmental effects, the environmental influences that distinguish siblings from one another. The non-shared environment may include differential treatment by parents, individually-distinct reactions to the shared family environment, peer influences, experiences outside the family, and test error in measurement. In adults, the non-shared environment may also include the unique roles and environments experienced after leaving the family of origin. Further effects of environment in adulthood are demonstrated by research suggesting that different work, marital, and family experiences are associated with personality change; these effects are supported by research involving the impact of major positive and negative life events on personality.

Family and Childhood Experiences:

Family and childhood experiences can have a significant impact on the development of an individual's personality. Here are some ways in which family and childhood experiences can affect personality development:

1. Attachment style: Attachment refers to the emotional bond that an infant develops with their primary caregiver. The quality of this attachment can influence an individual's personality development. For example, individuals who develop a secure attachment style may be more likely to have positive relationships with others, while those who develop an insecure attachment style may be more likely to struggle with relationships.
2. Parenting style: Parenting style refers to the way in which parents interact with their children. Different parenting styles can have different effects on an individual's personality development. For example, authoritarian parents, who are highly controlling and demanding, may lead to individuals who are less independent and less self-confident, while authoritative parents, who are warm and supportive but also set clear expectations and limits, may lead to individuals who are more self-confident and have better social skills.
3. Family dynamics: Family dynamics, such as the level of conflict, cohesion, and communication within a family, can also affect personality development. For example, individuals who grow up in families with high levels of conflict may be more likely to experience anxiety and depression, while those who grow up in families with supportive and nurturing relationships may be more resilient and better able to cope with stress.
4. Trauma and adversity: Childhood experiences of trauma, such as abuse, neglect, or exposure to violence, can have significant long-term effects on personality development. Individuals who experience trauma may be more likely to experience mental health issues such as anxiety and depression, and may also struggle with relationships and trust.
5. Cultural and socio-economic background: Cultural and socio-economic background can also influence personality development. For example, individuals from collectivistic cultures, which emphasize the importance of group harmony and interdependence, may have different personality traits than those from individualistic cultures, which emphasize independence and self-achievement. Similarly, individuals from low-income backgrounds may be more likely to experience stress and adversity, which can affect their personality development.

Overall, family and childhood experiences play a critical role in personality development. Understanding the impact of these experiences is essential for promoting healthy development and providing support to individuals who may have experienced trauma or adversity.

Peer Relationships:

Peer relationships can have a significant impact on the development of an individual's personality. Peer relationships refer to the interactions and social connections that an individual has with their peers, such as friends, classmates, and acquaintances. Here are some ways in which peer relationships can affect personality development:

1. Socialization: Peer relationships provide opportunities for socialization, which is the process of learning and internalizing social norms, values, and expectations. Through interactions with peers, individuals learn how to behave in social situations, develop communication and negotiation skills, and learn to regulate their emotions and behaviors in ways that are acceptable to others.
2. Identity formation: Peer relationships can also influence the development of an individual's identity. Adolescence is a time when individuals are trying to define who they are and what they stand for. Through interactions with peers, individuals can explore different aspects of themselves and develop a sense of identity.
3. Risk-taking behavior: Peer relationships can also influence risk-taking behavior. Adolescents who have peers who engage in risky behaviors, such as drug use or delinquency, may be more likely to engage in these behaviors themselves. On the other hand, adolescents who have peers who engage in prosocial behaviors, such as volunteering or academic achievement, are more likely to engage in these behaviors themselves.

=== Gene-environment interactions ===
A culmination of research suggests that the development of personality occurs in relation to one's genetics, one's environment, and the interaction between one's genetics and environment. Van Gestel and Van Broeckhoven (2003) write, "Almost by definition, complex traits originate from interplay between (multiple) genetic factors and environment." The corresponsive principle of personality development states that "life experiences may accentuate and reinforce the personality characteristics that were partially responsible for the particular environmental elicitations in the first place". This principle illustrates how gene-environment interactions maintain and reinforce personality throughout the lifespan. Three main types of gene-environment interactions are active (the process by which individuals with certain genotypes select and create environments that facilitate the expression of those genotypes), passive (the process by which genetic parents provide both the genes and the early environmental influences that contribute to the development of a characteristic in their children), and reactive (the process by which non-family individuals respond to the behavior produced by a genotype in characteristic ways).

An example of the way environment can moderate the expression of a gene is the finding by Heath, Eaves, and Martin (1998) that marriage was a protective factor against depression in identical twins, such that the heritability of depression was as low as 29% in a married twin and as high as 51% in an unmarried twin.

== Stability ==
Over the course of an individual's lifespan, the stability of their personality has been shown in a meta-analysis of longitudinal studies to be variable, although this variability levels out in adulthood. The beginning of one's personality stability is most evident at the age of 25 years. Behavioral genetics can account for the variability experienced across the lifespan. This is highly evident in the transitions between childhood, adolescence, and adulthood. From childhood to mid-adolescence, the rate of individual differences in personality increases, primarily due to environmental influences. However, genetic influences play a larger role than environmental influences in adulthood, resulting in fewer individual differences in personality between individuals who share similar genetics. In a longitudinal study of individuals across the span of fifty years from adolescence through adulthood, personality was found to be malleable, although variations in the level of malleability stabilized in adulthood.

While trait stability of the Big Five personality traits may not fully develop until adulthood, some longitudinal studies have found a strong (.60-.79) to moderate (.40-.59) correlation for personality trait stability through certain infant and youth age phases. Between the ages of two and 15, four-phase intervals were identified, from ages two-three, three-six, six-eight, and eight-15 years old. The strongest correlation came in the third interval (six-eight) where the measurements for all five traits measured above .50. However, from the ages of two to 15 there was a weak correlation for personality trait stability (.20) showing that while short-term age phases might be stable, long term development of personality traits is not correlated. Another study measured children through three stages of development, toddlerhood at the age of two, through early childhood at the ages of three through five, and finally into middle childhood from the ages of six through 10. Observer reports from both the mother and father of the children were used to measure their levels of positive emotionality, negative emotionality, and constraint through the age intervals. The correlations for positive emotionality (.39) and negative emotionality (.48) were not only consistent for both parents but also across the three stages of development. The correlational data for constraint was found to not be statistically significant through the ages.

The personality developing in college students based on the Big Five personality trait domains and facets within those domains has been studied. Rank-order stabilities of facets are high, with values greater than .50 (indicating a strong correlation); the results for trait domains were similar to individual facets. Variation in stability occurs across periods of the lifespan, such as adolescence and adulthood.

The stability and variation of personality is explained by a complex interaction between one's genetics and one's environment.
