= Andrea Meltzer =

American social psychologist, associate professor at Florida State University

- Education: University of Tennessee (PhD); Western Carolina University (MA)
- Known for: research on factors of relationship satisfaction
- Awards: 2017 Association for Psychological Science Rising Star Award
- Scientific career
- Fields: Social psychology, Intimate relationships, Evolutionary psychology
- Workplaces: Florida State University
- Thesis: When comments about looking good lead to feeling good : the interactive effects of valuing women for their sexual and non-sexual attributes (2004)

Andrea L. Meltzer is an associate professor in the Department of Psychology at Florida State University. She is known for her work integrating relationship science and evolutionary psychology to examine the dynamics of established relationships and factors of marital satisfaction.

== Education and career ==
Meltzer received her B.A. from Appalachian State University in 2004 and her M.A. from Western Carolina University in 2006. Meltzer earned her Ph.D. from the University of Tennessee in 2012. She was on the faculty of Southern Methodist University until 2015 when she moved to Florida State University. As of 2025, Meltzer is an associate professor at Florida State University.

== Research ==
Meltzer's research focuses on the intersection of relationship science and evolutionary psychology, particularly in intimate and long-term relationships. She employs longitudinal studies and multi-method assessments to explore relationship cognitions, emotions, and behaviors. Meltzer's work examines factors of relationship satisfaction, including sex differences, body image, individual differences, and hormonal cycles. Meltzer studies sociosexuality and infidelity in committed relationships and worked in the field of close relationships by quantifying the "sexual afterglow" effect.

== Honors and awards ==
In 2017 Meltzer received the Rising Star Award from the Association for Psychological Science.

== Selected publications ==
- Meltzer, Andrea L.; McNulty, James K. (2010). "Body image and marital satisfaction: Evidence for the mediating role of sexual frequency and sexual satisfaction". Journal of Family Psychology. 24 (2): 156–164. doi:10.1037/a0019063. ISSN 1939-1293. PMC 2864925. PMID 20438191.
- McNulty, James K.; Olson, Michael A.; Meltzer, Andrea L.; Shaffer, Matthew J. (November 29, 2013). "Though They May Be Unaware, Newlyweds Implicitly Know Whether Their Marriage Will Be Satisfying". Science. 342 (6162): 1119–1120. doi:10.1126/science.1243140. ISSN 0036-8075.
- Meltzer, Andrea L.; Makhanova, Anastasia; Hicks, Lindsey L.; French, Juliana E.; McNulty, James K.; Bradbury, Thomas N. (2017). "Quantifying the Sexual Afterglow: The Lingering Benefits of Sex and Their Implications for Pair-Bonded Relationships". Psychological Science. 28 (5): 587–598. doi:10.1177/0956797617691361. ISSN 0956-7976.
- McNulty, James K.; Meltzer, Andrea L.; Neff, Lisa A.; Karney, Benjamin R. (July 6, 2021). "How both partners' individual differences, stress, and behavior predict change in relationship satisfaction: Extending the VSA model" (PDF). Proceedings of the National Academy of Sciences. 118 (27). doi:10.1073/pnas.2101402118. ISSN 0027-8424. PMC 8271655. PMID 34183417.
