= Dark Triad Dirty Dozen =

Personality test for dark triad

The Dark Triad Dirty Dozen (DTDD) is a brief 12-question personality inventory test to assess the possible presence of the three subclinical dark triad traits: Machiavellianism, narcissism, and psychopathy. The DTDD was developed to identify the dark triad traits among subclinical adult populations. It is a screening test.

== Validity ==
Jonason and Webster conducted several validity tests of the DTDD as part of its development. Relevant outcomes have all shown statistically significant weaknesses.

- Convergent validity (i.e. the extent to which two tests that measure the same construct are strongly related) was assessed by comparing the DTDD subscales (i.e. Machiavellianism, psychopathy, narcissism) with established measures of each subscales; MACH IV, SRP-III, and NPI respectively. DTDD Machiavellianism was correlated with Mach IV at 0.34, DTDD psychopathy with SRP-III at 0.42 and DTDD Narcissism with NPI at 0.46. However, the SRP-III correlated stronger with DTDD Machiavellianism at 0.44 than DTDD psychopathy, a subscale that SRP-III should have the largest theoretical overlap with.
- Concurrent validity (i.e. whether measures of constructs that should be theoretically related does show high correlation) with the relevant Big Five personality traits was assessed using the Ten-Item Personality Inventory (TIPI) and the Big Five Inventory. As expected, the DTDD displayed negative but modest correlation with Agreeableness and Conscientiousness.
- Through comparison with an aggression scale, the DTDD showed some evidence of concurrent validity, as there were medium positive correlations with physical aggression, verbal aggression, hostility and anger. Subscales that were more theoretically associated with aggression (i.e. DTDD Machiavellianism and DTDD psychopathy) displayed stronger correlations with measures of aggression.
- The DTDD showed positive association (.31) with the Sociosexual Orientation Inventory (a personality test measuring individuals’ attitudes towards participating in casual sexual relationships), again, contributing to its concurrent validity.
- Jonason and McCain investigated the concurrent validity of the DTDD in relation to the HEXACO model of personality. In line with established measures of the dark triad traits, all the DTDD subscales showed strong negative association with the Honesty/Humility factor (ranging from -.52 to -.38) and significant but weaker negative correlation with Agreeableness (ranging from -.29 to -.21).

Other researchers have also conducted validity tests. Below are the examples of the findings:

- In a study investigating the DTDD's criterion validity on 200 undergraduate students, it was found that DTDD was significantly predictive of socially maladaptive outcome variables concerning sex (e.g. opting for short-term sexual relationships and likelihood of engaging in sexual harassment), money (e.g. conspicuous consumption and tendency to make unethical decisions for monetary gains) and power (e.g. one's perceived importance of power). However, DTDD was not as predictive of these outcomes as the Honesty-Humility trait of the HEXACO model of personality.
- The convergent validity specifically of the DTDD psychopathy subscale was assessed in a study with other established self-report psychopathy tests on 789 undergraduates and 75 male prisoners. DTDD psychopathy showed significant correlations with prominent measures of psychopathy including the Psychopathic Personality Inventory-Revised (.38), SRP-III (.46) and Levenson Self-Report Psychopathy scale (.48). However, this study reported less promising criterion validity of the DTDD, as results indicate that the standard psychopathy scales predicted externalising behaviours (including substance use, antisocial behaviour, domestic violence, and gambling) better than the DTDD psychopathy subscale.

== Reliability ==
In their first publication of DTDD, Jonason and Webster have reported overall good reliability of the personality scale:

- The test-retest reliability of the DTDD was investigated on 60 psychology university students. In this study, the participants completed the DTDD each week for three weeks. The average test-retest correlation was high: DTDD = 0.89, Machiavellianism = 0.86, psychopathy = 0.76, narcissism = 0.87.
- The item-level temporal reliability refers to whether responses of each item on the questionnaire retains stability across time. This was assessed on the same 60 psychology students over the course of three weeks. The average item-level temporal reliability was high: M = 0.92, P = 0.84, N = 0.92.
- The DTDD is also found to have satisfactory internal consistency reliability: DTDD = 0.86, M = 0.79, P = 0.77, N = 0.84. After revision of Item 6, a psychopathy-specific item, the internal consistency reliability of psychopathy subscale has improved from (on average) 0.60 to 0.77.

== Structure ==
The DTDD consists of 4 items per subscale (i.e. Machiavellianism, narcissism, and psychopathy). Responses are rated on a 7-point Likert scale, wherein 1 implies a strong disagreement and the opposite for 7. The Machiavellianism items assess characteristics such as manipulativeness, deceitfulness, and likelihood of employing flattery and exploitation for personal gain. The narcissism items are concerned with whether the individual seeks admiration, attention, status, and favours from others. The psychopathy items focus on features such as amorality, cynicism, callousness, and lack of remorse.

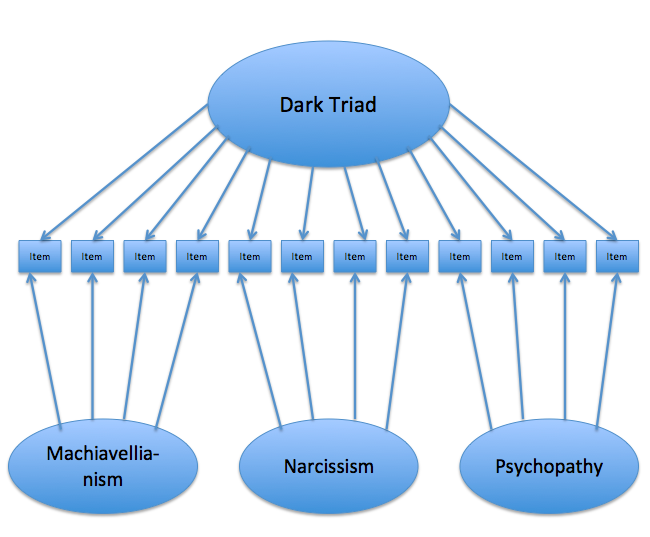
A diagram of the bi-factor model of the DTDD.

Theoretically, the three dark triad traits are treated as separate, but related constructs. In parallel with the factor structure of the dark triad traits, traditional tests of these traits measure each trait independently (e.g. NPI, SRP-III, Mach IV). Due to the DTDD's ability to measure all three constructs simultaneously, researchers have been inquiring whether the DTDD should be better conceptualised as a scale measuring a unitary factor, that is, a composite dark triad trait, or as a scale that measures three distinct but correlating factors. It has been previously demonstrated that the three-factor model (i.e. a scale measuring Machiavellianism, narcissism, and psychopathy) was more appropriate match for the DTDD more than the single-factor model (i.e. a scale measuring a compound dark triad factor). However further research on the DTDD's factor structure displayed that a bi-factor model yielded the most appropriate match. A bi-factor model combines the one-factor and three-factor models. In this model, both the general factor (i.e. composite dark triad factor) and the three factors of the DTDD subscales (i.e. Machiavellianism, narcissism, and psychopathy) account for the shared variance of the items.

== Development ==
The DTDD was developed due to the absence of a single, concise test which measured the three dark triad traits simultaneously. Prior to the development of the DTDD, researchers were required to use different personality tests for each of the dark triad traits. This made scoring difficult for researchers, as it required standardisation of scores of each test for comparison. Another issue with measuring all of dark triad traits by different tests was that it would involve too many items, making administration time-consuming and potentially fatiguing among test-takers, leading to less accurate responses.

As such, Jonason and Webster sought to develop a short and easily administrable measure of the dark triad by adapting items from traditional, existing measures of each dark triad construct, namely the Mach IV for Machiavellianism, the Self-Report Psychopathy Scale-III (SRP-III) for psychopathy, and the Narcissistic Personality Inventory (NPI) for narcissism. The researchers first identified 22 candidate items, and conducted a principal component analysis to identify items that would be included in the DTDD. Four items that contributed to each of the dark triad trait the most were added in the DTDD. Since Jonason and Webster identified a “problem” item that was contributing to lower internal consistency reliability, it was rephrased in the final version of the DTDD.

== Effects of sex and age ==
Given that personality tends to be unstable until adulthood, researchers have been reluctant to conduct self-report personality measures on younger people. In line with this, most studies on the DTDD have been administering the questionnaire in university student or adult samples; however, a study has suggested that it is also applicable to use in high-school aged population as well.

Consistent with studies investigating sex differences in scores of established measures of the dark triad traits, adult males tend to score higher on the DTDD than females, especially on the psychopathy subscale. Similar pattern of sex differences in the DTDD scores have been found among adolescents, however it is not as robust as the adult samples. Jones and Paulhus explain that this sex difference may emerge because males, more than females, tend to benefit more from using manipulative, exploitative strategies characteristic of the dark triad traits. Females may not benefit as much from engaging in these socially manipulative tactics as they tend to be more embedded in social structures.

== Adaptations ==
The DTDD has been translated and adapted for other cultures and languages, including French-Canadian, Japanese, Polish, Portuguese, Serbian, Spanish, Swedish, and Turkish versions.

The DTDD has been adapted for informants with the Dark Informant-rated Triad (DIRT)

== Alternatives to the DTDD ==
Other researchers saw the 12-item DTDD too brief in covering all relevant content involved in each of the dark triad traits. As an alternative brief measure, Jones and Paulhus have developed the 27-item Short Dark Triad (SD3) in 2014, consisting of 9 items for each of Machiavellianism, psychopathy and narcissism subscale. As opposed to the DTDD in which items were derived from existing dark triad measures, in the SD3, items were developed through considering theoretically relevant facets of the three traits.

== Criticisms of the DTDD ==
=== Comparison with the SD3 ===
Researchers have questioned DTDD's validity, especially in comparison to the SD3. It has been found that the convergent validity of the SD3 is superior to the DTDD in relation to existing measures of dark triad subscales in multiple studies. Researchers report that the SD3 performs better than the DTDD in terms of incremental validity (i.e. the extent of a new instrument to predict additional information that was not previously predicted by other instruments). Moreover, when content validity (i.e. whether a test captures the essential elements of a construct) of the two inventories was compared, the SD3 out-performed the DTDD. Researchers suggest that the DTDD's poorer performance on these validity outcomes may be due its sheer brevity and the large content overlap between the items, which grants the scale good internal consistency at the expense of sufficient coverage of theoretically significant content.

=== General critiques ===
The DTDD has also been criticised for its low discriminating power specifically for its narcissism subscale. An item response theory analysis has revealed that the DTDD narcissism items were the easiest to respond to compared to DTDD items for Machiavellianism and psychopathy. This implies that the DTDD narcissism subscale does not sufficiently discriminate between those with “normal” range of narcissism (which may result from having self confidence or high self-esteem) and those with “abnormal” levels of the trait.

Other researchers have criticised the sparse coverage of important psychopathy facets in the DTDD psychopathy subscale. Specifically, the DTDD does not account for disinhibition (i.e. impulsivity), which may explain why it has weaker correlations with relevant Big Five personality traits such as Agreeableness and Conscientiousness compared to established measures of psychopathy. They recommend that the DTDD should be used as an adjunct measure of psychopathy.

Whether the DTDD's psychopathy and Machiavellianism subscales are adequately distinct from each other has been questioned, given that they are conceptualised similarly in the questionnaire. A study demonstrated that the demarcation between the two subscales are blurred, as the DTDD Machiavellianism shows stronger correlation with a traditional measure of psychopathy rather than of Machiavellianism. This study concludes that at least among university student aged men, the DTDD is better understood as a measure of two factors; narcissism and “Machiavellianism-psychopathy”, where Machiavellianism is conceptualised as the subclinical form of psychopathy.
