= Sociosexuality =

Willingness for extra-relationship sexual activity

Sociosexuality, sometimes called sociosexual orientation, is the individual difference in the willingness to engage in sexual activity outside of a committed relationship. Individuals who are more restricted sociosexually are less willing to engage in casual sex; they prefer greater love, commitment and emotional closeness before having sex with romantic partners. Individuals who are more unrestricted sociosexually are more willing to have casual sex and are more comfortable engaging in sex without love, commitment or closeness.

== Measurement ==
The revised Sociosexual Orientation Inventory (SOI-R) was designed to measure sociosexuality, with high SOI scores corresponding to an unrestricted orientation and low SOI scores denoting a more restricted orientation. The SOI-R also allows for the separate assessment of three facets of sociosexuality: behavior, attitude and desire.

== Gender differences and sexual orientation ==
Men tend to have higher SOI scores and be more unrestricted than women across a variety of cultures. However, there is more variability in scores within each gender than between men and women, indicating that although the average man is less restricted than the average woman, individuals may vary in sociosexuality regardless of gender.

Bisexual women are significantly less restricted in their sociosexual attitudes than both lesbian and heterosexual women. Bisexual women are also the most unrestricted in sociosexual behavior, followed by lesbians and then, heterosexual women. Gay and bisexual men are similar to heterosexual men in sociosexual attitudes, in that they express relatively unrestricted attitudes relative to women. However, gay men are the most unrestricted in sociosexual behavior, followed by bisexual men and then, heterosexual men. This may be because gay men have more potential partners who prefer short-term, casual sexual encounters.

Unrestricted sociosexuality is associated with early life experiences with sex, more frequent sexual activity and a greater number of lifetime sex partners. Unrestricted women tend to have more sexual fantasies involving having dominance and lower levels of sexual conservatism than restricted women.

== Individual differences ==
Individuals who are sociosexually unrestricted tend to score higher on openness to experience, and be more extraverted, less agreeable, lower on honesty-humility, more erotophilic, more impulsive, more likely to take risks, more likely to have an avoidant attachment style, less likely to have a secure attachment style, and score higher on the dark triad traits (i.e. narcissism, Machiavellianism, psychopathy). Higher masculinity and eveningness in women is related to unrestricted sociosexuality. High self-monitoring is also associated with unrestricted sociosexuality, regardless of gender or sexual orientation.

Individuals with an intrinsic religious orientation (i.e., religion as an end) tend to be sociosexually restricted, while those with an extrinsic religious orientation (i.e., religion as a means to achieve non-religious goals) tend to be unrestricted.

== Mating tendencies ==
=== Motives ===
Unrestricted women are more motivated to engage in casual sex than restricted women as they perceive more benefits associated with short-term mating. These include sexual benefits (e.g., experiencing the novelty of a new partner), resource benefits (e.g., receiving expensive gifts) and the improvement of their seduction skills. Sociosexuality is not associated with short-term benefits for men.

When viewing attractive female models, unrestricted men are more interested in the models' physical attractiveness, while restricted men show more interest in the social traits presumably possessed by attractive females. Unrestricted women report more interest in attractive male models' popularity and are less interested in their willingness to commit, compared to restricted women.

=== Mate preferences ===
Men and women with an unrestricted sociosexual orientation view short-term mates with greater sexual experience as more desirable, whereas restricted women perceive partners' sexual inexperience as desirable. Unrestricted individuals place more importance on partners' physical attractiveness and sex appeal, while restricted individuals place more weight on characteristics indicative of good personal and parenting qualities (e.g., kind, responsible, faithful). Judgement of sexual attractiveness is more variable in unrestricted men than in restricted males.

Individuals are able to accurately assess the sociosexuality of computer-generated and real faces, with unrestricted sociosexuality being associated with greater attractiveness in female faces and greater masculinity in male faces. Women tend to prefer male faces associated with restricted sociosexuality, while men prefer unrestricted female faces, both for short-term and long-term partners.

=== Relationship interactions ===
Unrestricted women report engaging in more social interactions with men on a daily basis than restricted women. However, unrestricted individuals rate their interactions with their best friends (non-romantic) as lower in quality (i.e., as less pleasant and satisfying) than restricted individuals. Unrestricted individuals are also more likely to view cheating or infidelity as acceptable under certain conditions (e.g., when involved in a bad relationship), and report engaging in more cheating than restricted individuals. The relationship between sociosexual orientation and infidelity is mediated by commitment, meaning unrestricted individuals may cheat because they are less committed to their partner than restricted individuals.

== Hormones ==
Individuals who are partnered typically have lower testosterone levels than individuals who are single. However, this was found to apply solely to individuals who have a restricted sociosexuality. Partnered, unrestricted men and women's testosterone levels are more similar to the levels of single men and women.

== Culture ==
In regions that suffer from a high prevalence of infectious diseases, both men and women report lower levels of sociosexuality, as the costs of an incautious lifestyle (i.e., being unrestricted) may outweigh the benefits.

== Implications ==
Possessing an unrestricted sociosexuality seems to increase the likelihood of having a son by 12-19% in American samples. This may be explained by the generalized Trivers-Willard hypothesis, which states that parents who possess any heritable trait that increases males' reproductive success above females' will have more sons, and will have more daughters if they possess traits that increase females' reproductive success above males'. Since unrestricted sociosexuality increases the reproductive fitness of sons more than daughters (as males have the potential to have more offspring through casual sex), unrestricted parents have a higher-than-expected offspring sex ratio (more sons).

== Relevant theories ==
=== Parental investment theory ===
According to the parental investment theory, the gender that invests more in offspring tends to be more discriminating and more sociosexually restricted (usually women, due to pregnancy, childbirth and lactation). In a year, a woman can give birth once (except in the case of a multiple pregnancy), regardless of the number of partners she has had, whereas a man can potentially have more children than the number of women with whom he has slept due to multiple births. Thus, women should be more selective and restricted in order to have children with partners possessing good genes and resources, who can provide for potential offspring. Men, however, may increase their reproductive fitness by being unrestricted and having many children with many women. Thus, since men do not need to invest as much physically (no pregnancy), they tend to have a more unrestricted sociosexuality.

=== Sex ratio theory ===
Operational sex ratio is the number of sexually competing males versus the number of sexually competing females in the local mating pool. High sex ratios indicate that there are more men than women available, while low sex ratios imply more women than men are sexually available. High sex ratios (more men) are associated with lower SOI scores (more restricted sociosexual orientation), as men must satisfy women's preference for long-term monogamous relationships if they are to effectively compete for the limited number of women. Low sex ratios (more women) are correlated with more unrestricted sociosexuality, as men can afford to demand more casual sex if they are relatively scarce and in demand.

=== Strategic pluralism theory ===
Strategic pluralism suggests that women evolved to evaluate men on two dimensions: their potential to be a good provider for offspring and their degree of genetic quality. The local environment should have influenced which mate characteristics were preferred by women. In demanding environments where biparental care was critical to infant survival, women should have valued good parenting qualities more, leading men to adopt a more restricted sociosexuality and invest more in their offspring to help ensure their children survive. In disease-prevalent environments, good genes that would help offspring resist pathogens should have been prioritized by women, leading healthy men to be more sociosexually unrestricted in order to pass on their genes to many offspring.

=== Social structural theory ===
According to social structural theory, the division of labor and social expectations lead to gender differences in sociosexuality. In cultures with more traditional gender roles (where women have less freedom than men), gender differences in sociosexuality are larger. In these societies, where women have less access to power and money than men, it is expected that women should be more sexually restricted and only have sexual relations with men in the context of a committed relationship, whereas men may be sexually unrestricted if they wish. In more egalitarian societies, where men and women have equal access to power and money, the gender difference in sociosexuality is less pronounced, as individuals may take on the social role of the other gender.

== See also ==
- Friends with benefits relationships
- Human sexuality
- Polyamory
- Promiscuity
- Sexual arousal
- Sexual orientation
- Situational sexual behavior
