= Dark triad =

Offensive personality types

Illustration of the dark triad components

The dark triad is a psychological construct of personality traits, first introduced by Delroy L. Paulhus and Kevin M. Williams in 2002, that describes the relationship between three notably aversive but non-pathological personality traits: Machiavellianism, sub-clinical narcissism, and sub-clinical psychopathy. These personality traits are called dark because they are believed to contain aversive qualities.

All three dark triad traits are believed to be conceptually distinct, although empirical evidence shows them to be overlapping. They are associated with a callous–manipulative interpersonal style.

- Narcissism is characterized by grandiosity, pride, egotism, and a lack of empathy.
- Machiavellianism is characterized by manipulativeness, indifference to morality, lack of empathy, and a calculated focus on self-interest.
- Psychopathy is characterized by continuous antisocial behavior, impulsivity, selfishness, callous and unemotional traits (CU), and remorselessness.

High scores in these traits have been found to statistically increase a person's likelihood of committing crimes, cause social distress, and create severe problems for organizations, especially if found in people who are in leadership positions. People who score high on these traits also tend to be less compassionate, agreeable, empathetic, and satisfied with their lives, and less likely to believe they and others are good. However, the same traits are also associated with some positive outcomes, such as mental toughness and willingness to embrace challenges.

A factor analysis found that among the Big Five personality traits, low agreeableness is the strongest correlate of the dark triad, while neuroticism and a lack of conscientiousness were associated with some of the dark triad members. Research indicates that there is a consistent association between changes in agreeableness and the dark triad traits over the course of an individual's life.

== History ==
In 1998, John McHoskey, William Worzel, and Christopher Szyarto provoked a controversy by claiming that narcissism, Machiavellianism, and psychopathy are more or less interchangeable in normal samples. Delroy L. Paulhus and McHoskey debated these perspectives at a subsequent American Psychological Association conference, inspiring a body of research that continues to grow in the published literature. Paulhus and Kevin Williams found enough behavioral, personality, and cognitive differences between the traits to suggest that they were distinct constructs; however, they concluded that further research was needed to elucidate how and why they overlap. While some psychologists argue that Machiavellianism seems to be indistinguishable from psychopathy and that scales of Machiavellianism seem to measure the psychopathy construct, there is enough evidence to suggest that they are two separate traits, as Paulhus notes that psychopaths are impulsive and careless, which is opposed to the behavior of High Machs who are calculating and plan for the long term.

== Components ==
The dark triad traits have significant theoretical and empirical overlap. All three traits share characteristics such as a lack of empathy, interpersonal hostility, and interpersonal offensiveness.

A number of measures have been developed to measure all three dark triad traits simultaneously, such as the Dirty Dozen and the Short Dark Triad (SD3). Most of these measures are questionnaire-style and either self-response or observer-response (e.g., ratings from supervisors or coworkers as measured by the Dark Informant-Rated Triad [DIRT]). Both methods can prove problematic when attempting to measure any socially aversive trait. Self-responders may be motivated to lie, and with observer responses—particularly for Machiavellianism—individuals who are skilled at deceiving and manipulating others should be perceived as low in deceptiveness and manipulation by others, resulting in inaccurate ratings.

One study claimed that the Dirty Dozen gives mixed results on the construct validity of previous studies done on it. To show this, the study used a sample of over 3000 people and measured the convergent validity of the traits to other measures and questionnaires. They then used Item Response Theory to analyze all of the results. This showed that there was an uneven distribution in the traits and that the scale was better at revealing Machiavellianism and psychopathy than narcissism.

=== Narcissism ===
Individuals who score high on narcissism display grandiosity, entitlement, dominance, and superiority. Narcissism has been found to correlate positively with extraversion and openness and negatively with agreeableness. Narcissism has also been found to have a significant correlation with psychopathy.

Assessment of narcissism required clinical interviews until the popular Narcissistic Personality Inventory (NPI) was created by Raskin and Hall in 1979. Since the NPI, several other measures have emerged which attempt to provide self-report alternatives for personality disorder assessment. In addition, new instruments have been developed to study vulnerable narcissism and pathological narcissism as opposed to grandiose narcissism, which is what many argue the NPI measures.

=== Machiavellianism ===
People who score high on this trait, conceptualized in 1970 by psychologists Richard Christie and Florence Geis, are callous, unprincipled, and are excessively motivated by self-interest. They view interpersonal manipulation as the key for life success, and behave accordingly. Individuals who are measured to have a high level of Machiavellianism tend to have low agreeableness and conscientiousness.

The original published version of the MACH-IV is the most widely used measure in empirical research. Those who score high are classified as High Machs, while those who score low are classified as Low Machs. Overall, High Machs are more likely to be manipulative, exploitative, and callous, while Low Machs are the opposite, viewing others in more of an empathetic viewpoint.

=== Psychopathy ===
Psychopathy is considered the most malevolent of the dark triad. Individuals who score high on psychopathy show low levels of empathy and high levels of impulsivity and thrill-seeking. With respect to the Big Five personality factors, psychopathy has been found to correlate negatively with agreeableness and conscientiousness.

Robert Hare revolutionized the study of psychopathy with his Psychopathy Checklist (PCL), and its revision (PCL-R). Hare noted that asking psychopaths to self-report on psychologically important matters does not necessarily provide accurate or unbiased data. However, efforts have been made to study psychopathy in the dimensional realm using self-reported instruments, as with the Levenson Primary and Secondary Psychopathy Scales, the Psychopathic Personality Inventory, and the Self-Report Psychopathy Scale.

== Other forms ==
Other groupings of dark personality traits have been proposed.

=== Dark tetrad ===
Several researchers have suggested that everyday sadism should be considered a fourth dark trait. While sadism is highly correlated with the dark triad, sadism predicts anti-social behavior beyond the dark triad. Sadism shares common characteristics with psychopathy and antisocial behavior (lack of empathy, readiness for emotional involvement, inflicting suffering), but sadism distinctively predicts unprovoked aggression separate from psychopathy. Furthermore, sadism predicts delinquent behavior separately from the other dark triad traits when evaluating high school students. Harmful behavior against living creatures, brutal and destructive amoral dispositions, and criminal recidivism are additionally more prominently predicted by sadism than psychopathic traits.

Due to its overlap with psychopathy, scholars have questioned its inclusion in the dark tetrad model. However, Johnson et al. stated that the results of their research "support sadism’s inclusion within the Dark Tetrad as a unique construct but with some conceptual overlap with psychopathy". Nevertheless, Christian Blötner and others believe that measures of subclinical sadism and psychopathy still have problems of redundancy.

Studies on how sadists gain pleasure from cruelty to subjects were applied towards testing people who possessed dark triad traits. Results showed that only people exhibiting traits of sadism derived a sense of pleasure from acts of cruelty, concluding that sadism encompasses distinctly cruel traits not covered by the rest of the dark triad, therefore deserving of its position within the dark tetrad.

=== Dark factor ===
Some researchers have proposed the existence of a Dark Factor of Personality, a hypothetical general disposition that underlies a broad range of aversive traits, including the Dark Triad traits and others such as aggression and cheating. This factor is a potential explanation for the substantial overlap often observed among the Dark Triad traits. However, the Dark Factor of Personality is not fully equivalent to the latent factor that can be extracted from the Dark Triad traits alone using factor analysis. This Dark Triad core is also a possible explanation for the overlap between narcissism, Machiavellianism and psychopathy.

=== Vulnerable dark triad ===
The vulnerable dark triad comprises three related and similar constructs: vulnerable narcissism, secondary psychopathy, and borderline personality traits. A study found that these three constructs are significantly related to one another and manifest similar nomological networks. Although the vulnerable dark triad members are related to negative emotionality and antagonistic interpersonal styles, they are also related to introversion and disinhibition.

According to both research and theory, persons who are highly affected by the Dark Triad are influenced by external, controllable factors. On the contrary, those who are high in the Vulnerable Dark Triad (VDT) are driven by internal, embedded desires.

== Unification of traits ==
Researchers who criticize the dark triad model note that many of the theoretical characteristics that are believed to separate psychopathy, narcissism, and Machiavellianism from each other do not appear in empirical research. Machiavellianism in particular is stated to be distinguished from psychopathy by better impulse control and the ability to form strategic long term plans, but Machiavellianism has also been correlated with reckless behavior in certain situations. Many of the traits within measures of psychopathy already include Machiavellianism and narcissism. For example, Machiavellianism is featured in most of the Factor 1 traits in the PCL-R, in the "Interpersonal Manipulation" factor within the Hare's Self-Report Psychopathy Scale-III, and in the "Manipulation" scale in the Elemental Psychopathy Assessment. Narcissism is featured within the Psychopathy Checklist as "grandiose sense of self-worth". Overall, Factor 1 of the Psychopathy Checklist is correlated heavily with narcissism, and it been dubbed "aggressive narcissism". Machiavellianism and psychopathy also share nearly the exact same correlations between the Big Five personality traits, which led one research team to conclude that the results of the study supported McHoskey's claim that Machiavellianism "is a global measure of Psychopathy in non-institutionalized populations." Even a study from 2016 notes that Machiavellianism seems to be indistinguishable from psychopathy and that scales of Machiavellianism seem to measure the psychopathy construct. Because of these issues, researchers have proposed that the dark triad traits be merged into one singular construct. Some authors have stated that Machiavellianism and psychopathy represent the issue of a jangle fallacy, as both constructs are named differently yet describe the same concept. Narcissism has also been viewed as interchangeable with Machiavellianism.

== Psychometrics ==
=== Dirty Dozen ===
The Dark Triad Dirty Dozen (or DTDD) is a 12-question personality inventory test to assess the possible presence of the three subclinical dark triad traits. The DTDD was developed to identify the dark triad traits among subclinical adult populations. It is a screening test. Analyses of the DTDD measure suggest that its subscales are built on a possibly unstable common foundation associated with lower levels of emotional stability and conscientiousness. However, each Dark Triad trait demonstrates its own distinct pattern of relationships with the Big Five. Researchers have questioned DTDD's validity, especially in comparison to the SD3. It has been found that the convergent validity of the SD3 is superior to the DTDD in relation to existing measures of dark triad subscales in multiple studies. Researchers report that the SD3 performs better than the DTDD in terms of incremental validity (i.e. the extent of a new instrument to predict additional information that was not previously predicted by other instruments).

=== Short Dark Triad ===
The Short Dark Triad (or SD3) is a 27-item test, with 9 questions measuring each trait. It is answered on a 5 point Likert scale from strongly disagree to strongly agree. It was created as an alternative to the original 50 item measure and the even briefer 12 item Dirty Dozen, which has been criticized for oversimplification. Example items include "I like to get acquainted with important people" for narcissism, "I have used deceit or lied to get my way" for Machiavellianism, and "I tend to be callous or insensitive" for psychopathy. The SD3 measures subclinical traits present in varying degrees in the general population rather than clinical personality disorders. The scale balances brevity with adequate validity, making it popular in organizational, social, and personality psychology research, though criticisms include some item overlap between Machiavellianism and psychopathy and weaker discriminant validity than full length scales. Though the research by Persson and others led them to conclude that the Short Dark Triad does not effectively separate Machiavellianism from psychopathy, since their items largely converge on a shared general factor. When modeled using a two factor approach, the most appropriate structure combines Machiavellianism and psychopathy into a single specific dimension, while narcissism emerges as a distinct factor. By contrast, models with two or three separate factors show comparable, but not superior, fit. As a result, they recommended that researchers rely on an overall SD3 score rather than interpreting individual subscales, given that the sub-dimensions contain relatively little variance.

== Psychiatric disorders ==
Psychopathy and narcissism both have their clinical counterparts recognized by psychiatrists, known as narcissistic personality disorder (or NPD) and antisocial personality disorder (or ASPD). Given the dimensional model of narcissism and psychopathy, these traits are present at the subclinical level, meaning that they are present in the general population as opposed to clinical settings. People with subclinical traits can be identified using self-report assessments that are appropriate for the general population. In the general population, the prevalence rates for sub-clinical and clinical psychopathy are estimated at 1% and 0.2%, respectively.

Machiavellianism has never been referenced in the Diagnostic and Statistical Manual of Mental Disorders. It has always been treated solely as a personality construct.

== Behaviors ==
=== In the workplace ===
Oliver James identifies each of the three dark triadic personality traits as typically being prevalent in the workplace. Furnham (2010) has identified that the dark triad is related to the acquisition of leadership positions and interpersonal influence. In a meta-analysis of dark triad and workplace outcomes, Jonason and colleagues (2012) found that each of the dark triad traits were related to manipulation in the workplace, but each via unique mechanisms. Specifically, Machiavellianism was related with the use of excessive charm in manipulation, narcissism was related with the use of physical appearance, and psychopathy was related with physical threats. Jonason and colleagues also found that the dark triad traits fully mediated the relationship between gender and workplace manipulation. All three dark triad traits lead to knowledge sabotage and knowledge hiding. It was shown that those high on Machiavellianism are more drawn to academic majors like economics, law, and politics, as opposed to the "person-oriented" majors like education, nursing, and social work that were associated with lower Machiavellianism scores. High levels of the Dark Triad negatively affects subordinates' career success and well-being. Individuals high in MACH found it easier to obtain leadership positions, and a better salary. Machiavellianism was identified as a significant moderator in the relationship between perceptions of both adhocracy and hierarchy cultures and bullying victimization. A 2017 UK study found that companies with leaders who show "psychopathic characteristics" destroy shareholder value, tending to have poor future returns on equity. Narcissists typically perform well at job interviews; they receive more favorable hiring ratings from interviewers than individuals who are not narcissists. Typically, because they can make favorable first impressions, though that may not translate to better job performance once hired.

=== Internet trolls ===
Recent studies have found that people who are identified as internet trolls tend to have dark personality traits and show signs of sadism, antisocial behavior, psychopathy, and Machiavellianism. The 2013 case study suggested that there are a number of similarities between anti-social and flame trolling activities, and the 2014 survey indicated that trolling is a manifestation of everyday sadism. Both studies suggest that this trolling may be linked to bullying in both adolescents and adults. A 2021 study found that the dark triad's influence may be mediated by malicious motives, and that there is no strong connection between having these traits and engaging in trolling.

=== Crime ===
Adolescents who score higher in dark triad traits show higher amounts of violent delinquency, specifically with interpersonal violence. Individuals with low self control and dark triad traits showed more overall delinquency, however higher self control lowered the delinquency. Another study found that those who have admitted to stealing at some point in their life score higher on Machiavellianism and primary and secondary psychopathy. Those higher in psychopathy and Machiavellianism were shown to predict psychological abuse with intimate partner violence, however agreeableness was found to be the main factor.

=== Cyber crime ===
There is a clear distinction in the methods of a cyber attack between each part of the dark triad. Psychopathy correlated with faster speeds of persistence and exploitation; narcissism correlated with faster privilege escalation, persistence, and extraction; and Machiavellianism correlated with stealth. Individuals with higher levels of psychopathy are more likely to engage in cyber bullying, with some correlation to both narcissism and Machiavellianism. Individuals with dark triad traits were also found to be more likely to commit acts of online fraud, with each trait having different impacts on factors. Machiavellianism has impacts on opportunity and motivation; psychopathy has impacts on rationalization; and narcissism has impacts on perceptions of motivation and capabilities.

=== Ideology ===
Dark triad characteristics correlate with support for various extremist ideologies. Support for the alt-right, which was prolifically associated with online trolling and harassment, and politically correct authoritarianism both correlate with all three traits as well as measures of entitlement. To a lesser extent, support for a more liberal form of political correctness correlates negatively with psychopathy. Dark triad characteristics correlate positively with out-group threat perceptions, anti-immigrant prejudice, and social dominance orientation, a psychological disposition toward group-based supremacy. Costello et al (2022) found that left- and right-wing authoritarianism correlate similarly with psychopathy. Bell et al noted that the findings for associations between the Dark Triad and political orientations have been mixed.

=== Sex and relationships ===
Psychologists have studied how dark triad traits affected individuals in their romantic relationships. In most cases these traits cause people to have shorter-term relationships. The people who tend to score higher in these traits will gravitate towards relationship types such as "one-night stands" (primarily sexual relationships that occur one time only), "hook-ups", "booty-calls" (i.e., relationships where there is solicitation from a non-long-term partner for the explicit or implicit intent of engaging in sexual activity), and even "friends with benefits" relationships. People who score highly in dark triad traits tend to be less likely to have long-lasting relationships, and report lower relationship satisfaction. They are also more willing to terminate relationships than people who score lower on the dark triad. Crysel et al. theorized that the dark triad traits relate positively to impulsivity, sensation-seeking, and risky behavior. Across two of their studies involving more than 1,400 participants, dark triad traits were found to be positively related to impulsivity and sensation-seeking.

A study published in 2020 proposed that men who embody the dark tetrad are well-represented among the clientele of prostitutes. However, the authors admit that "there is a dearth of research on the personality characteristics that typify men who buy sex from those who do not", while other researchers have claimed that there "is no evidence of a peculiar quality that differentiates customers in general from men who have not paid for sex."

== Origins ==
=== Genetics and environment ===
In a similar manner to research on the Big Five personality traits, twin studies have been conducted in an effort to understand the relative contributions of genetic and environmental factors in the development of dark triad traits.

All three traits of the dark triad have been found to have substantial genetic components. It has also been found that the observed relationships between the three traits, and with the Big Five, are strongly driven by individual differences in genes. Within the triad, psychopathy and narcissism have both been found to be more inheritable than Machiavellianism.

Environmental factors contribute to the development of dark triad traits, although they have less influence than genetics. During childhood and adolescence, environmental factors that are not shared with siblings (such as friends or extracurricular activities) contribute to all three dark triad traits. However, only Machiavellianism is related to environmental factors that are shared with siblings. The results of a study among German adolescents reveal a positive association between the experience of parental rejection by both parents and punishment as well as parental control and overprotection and Machiavellianism, narcissism and psychopathy. Some researchers have interpreted these findings to mean that, of the three, Machiavellianism is the trait most likely to be influenced by the environment.

=== Evolution ===
Evolutionary theory may also explain the development of dark triad traits. Despite the relationship of these traits with clinical disorders, some argue that adaptive qualities may accompany the maladaptive ones; their frequency in the gene pool requires at least some local adaptation. The everyday versions of these traits appear in student and community samples, where even high levels can be observed among individuals who manage to get along in daily life. Even in these samples, research indicates correlations with aggression, racism, and bullying among other forms of social aversiveness.

It has been argued that evolutionary behavior predicts not only the development of dark triad personalities, but also the flourishing of such personalities. Indeed, it has been found that individuals demonstrating dark triad personality can be highly successful in society. However, this success is typically short-lived. The main evolutionary argument behind the dark triad traits emphasizes mating strategies. This argument is based on life history theory, which proposes that individuals differ in reproductive strategies; an emphasis on mating is termed a "fast life" strategy, while an emphasis on parenting is termed a "slow reproductive" strategy. There is some evidence that the dark triad traits are related to fast life history strategies; however, there have been some mixed results, and not all three dark triad traits have been related to this strategy. A more detailed approach has attempted to account for some of these mixed results by analyzing the traits at a finer level of detail. These researchers found that while some components of the dark triad are related to a fast life strategy, other components are related to slow reproductive strategies.

==== Accelerated mating strategy ====
Studies have suggested that, on average, those who exhibit the dark triad of personality traits have an accelerated mating strategy, reporting more sex partners, more favorable attitudes towards casual sex, lowered standards in their short-term mates, a tendency to steal or poach mates from others, more risk-taking in the form of substance abuse, a tendency to prefer immediate but smaller amounts of money over delayed but larger amounts of money, limited self-control and greater incidence of ADHD symptoms, and a pragmatic and game-playing romance style. These traits have been identified as part of a strategy that appears to be enacted by an exploitative, opportunistic, and protean approach to life in general and at work.

The evidence is mixed regarding the exact link between the dark triad and reproductive success. For example, there is a lack of empirical evidence for reproductive success in the case of psychopathy. Additionally, these traits are not universally short-term-oriented nor are they all impulsive. Furthermore, much of the research reported pertaining to the dark triad cited in the above paragraph is based on statistical procedures that assume the dark triad is a single construct, in spite of genetic and meta-analytic evidence to the contrary.

==== Physical attractiveness ====
There has been research on the potential "attractiveness" of the dark triad traits. Out of all of the traits in the dark triad, Machiavellianism was the least attractive to the opposite sex. One of the studies concluded that "The third DT trait, Machiavellianism, was significantly negatively associated with being chosen and mate appeal for STR (short term relationships) in women." Another study claimed that this was because high Machs tend to be much less extroverted than narcissists and psychopaths, and that "it is possible that individuals do not like cynical, manipulative, aggressive, remorseless, and duplicitous people such as Machiavellians and psychopaths". Two more studies found that only narcissistic subjects were judged to be better-looking, but the other dark triad traits of Machiavellianism and psychopathy had no correlation with looks. Facial features associated with dark triad traits tend to be rated as less attractive.

A 2020 study concluded that "only narcissism was positively correlated to self-perceived attractiveness and mate value in both sexes."

== Group differences ==
=== Gender ===
The most pronounced group difference is in gender: numerous studies have shown that men tend to score higher than women on narcissism, Machiavellianism, and psychopathy, although the magnitude of the difference varies across traits, the measurement instruments, and the age of the participants. One interesting finding related to narcissism—albeit one based on non-representative samples—is that while men continue to score higher than women, it seems that the gender gap has shrunk considerably when comparing cohort data from 1992 and 2006. More specifically, the aforementioned findings indicate that there has been a general increase in levels of narcissism over time among college students of both sexes, but comparatively, the average level of narcissism in women has increased more than the average level of narcissism in men. When looking at the Dirty Dozen measurement, one study found that men generally scored higher in narcissism and psychopathy than women, and that there was little variance between sex for Machiavellianism. One explanation was that the traditional gender roles in society contribute to these differences. A different study in 2017, using three separate samples of adults from northern Italy and an Italian version of the Dirty Dozen measurement, found that the difference in scores between men and women are not caused by measurement errors. It also found that men scored much higher than women in Machiavellianism and psychopathy than in narcissism.

=== Race ===
There is far less information available on race differences in dark triad traits, and the data that is available is not representative of the population at-large. For instance, a 2008 research study using undergraduate participants found that Caucasians reported higher levels of narcissism relative to Asians. Similarly, another 2008 study using undergraduate participants found that Caucasians tended to score slightly higher than non-Caucasians on Machiavellianism. When attempting to discern whether there are ethnic differences in psychopathy, researchers have addressed the issue using different measurement instruments (e.g., the Self-Report Psychopathy Scale and The Psychopathic Personality Inventory), but no race differences have been found regardless of the measure used. Additionally, when comparing Caucasians and African Americans from correctional, substance abuse, and psychiatric samples—groups with typically high prevalence rates of psychopathy—researchers again failed to find any meaningful group differences in psychopathy. However, according to a fringe research study conducted by Richard Lynn, a substantial racial difference in psychopathy was found. Lynn proposes "that there are racial and ethnic differences in psychopathic personality conceptualised as a continuously distributed trait, such that high values of the trait are present in blacks and Native Americans, intermediate values in Hispanics, lower values in whites and the lowest values in East Asians." However this research has been unanimously criticized for having "serious conceptual and factual errors" such as not distinguishing between psychopathy and other anti-social behaviors, confusing between personality and behavioral concepts of psychopathy and presuming rather than demonstrating genetic or evolutionary causes for supposed disparities. Fanti and others state that Lynn's research was based on the MMPI, and concluded that "Related to this, Lynn’s (2002) failure to incorporate any research on PCL-based measures of psychopathy represents a serious limitation."

=== Generational differences ===
Based on analyses of responses to the Narcissistic Personality Inventory collected from over 16,000 U.S. undergraduate students between 1979 and 2006, it was concluded that average levels of narcissism had increased over time. Similar results were obtained in a follow-up study that analyzed the changes within each college campus. However, a 2017 study found little evidence of strong or widespread cohort-linked changes in disposition or behavioral strategies, although they did find some indications that the current generation is more cynical and less trusting.

An alternative perspective explored group differences in the dark triad and how they relate to positive emotion. Applying structural equation modeling and Latent Profile Analysis, a type of mixture model, to establish patterns in UK, US, and Canadian students, four groups were found: "unhappy but not narcissistic", "vulnerable narcissism", "happy non-narcissism" and "grandiose narcissism". Some extrapolations on how a person might deal with these groups of individuals in practice have been suggested.

== Relationship to other personality models ==
=== Big Five ===
The five factor model of personality has significant relationships with the dark triad combined and with each of the dark triad's traits. The dark triad overall is negatively related to both agreeableness and conscientiousness. More specifically, Machiavellianism captures a suspicious versus trusting view of human nature which is also captured by the Trust sub-scale on the agreeableness trait. Extraversion captures similar aspects of assertiveness, dominance, and self-importance as narcissism. Narcissism also is positively related to the achievement striving and competence aspects of Conscientiousness. Psychopathy has the strongest correlations with low dutifulness and deliberation aspects of Conscientiousness.

=== Honesty–humility ===
The honesty–humility factor from the HEXACO model of personality is used to measure sincerity, fairness, greed avoidance, and modesty. Honesty–Humility has been found to be strongly negatively correlated to the dark triad traits. Likewise, all three dark triad traits are strongly negatively correlated with Honesty–Humility. The conceptual overlap of the three traits which represents a tendency to manipulate and exploit others for personal gain defines the negative pole of the honesty–humility factor. As honesty-humility is very strongly linked to the dark triad traits, if someone is low on honesty-humility, there is a higher chance for that individual to have Dark Triad traits. In fact, the link with higher Machiavellianism scores and lower Honesty-Humility in particular is very strong.

=== Light triad ===
Influenced by the dark triad, Scott Barry Kaufman and colleagues proposed a light triad of personality traits: humanism, Kantianism, and faith in humanity. High scorers on humanism are more likely to value others' dignity and self-worth. High scorers on Kantianism are more likely to see others as people, not as a means to an end. High scorers for faith in humanity are more likely to believe others are fundamentally good. When comparing individuals who take both dark triad and light triad tests, the average person was more likely to exhibit light triad traits. This test is not an inversion of dark triad tests, as Kaufman instead focused on developing characteristics that were conceptually opposite from the dark triad. A reliable measure of the light triad traits was developed, and demonstrated that they are not simply the opposite of the dark triad's Big Five and HEXACO model traits. The light triad predicts positive and negative outcomes regarding Agreeableness and Honesty-Humility personality traits, and expands on understanding the dark triad as a useful contrasting analog.

Individuals who score high on light triad traits also report higher levels of religiosity, spirituality, life satisfaction, acceptance of others, belief that they and others are good, compassion, empathy, self-esteem, authenticity, sense of self, positive enthusiasm, having a quiet ego, openness to experience, and conscientiousness. Additionally, those who score higher on the light triad scale are intellectually curious, secure in their attachments to others, and more tolerant to other perspectives. These individuals typically have less motives for achievement and self-enhancement (even though the light triad was positively related to productivity and competence). In contrast to the character strengths of the dark triad, the light triad was uncorrelated with bravery or assertiveness. Lack of such characteristics may be problematic for individuals attempting to reach more challenging goals and fully self-actualizing.

=== Atlas of Personality, Emotion and Behaviour ===
The Atlas of Personality, Emotion and Behaviour is a catalogue of 2,400 words descriptive of personality, emotion and behaviour. The words in the catalogue were scored according to a two dimensional matrix taxonomy with orthogonal dimensions of affiliation and dominance. Adjectives representing the behavioural patterns described by the Dark Triad were scored according to the atlas and visualised using kernel density plots in two dimensions. The atlas delineates the three components of the Dark Triad, narcissism (green), Machiavellianism (blue), and psychopathy (red).

== Criticism ==
Some researchers have criticised the dark triad and studies which use it as a foundation, arguing that "such work is often superficial, statistically weak, and presents an overly simplistic view of human nature." Clinical psychologist Joshua Miller published a critical appraisal of dark triad literature in 2019, arguing that issues and limitations had been "unrecognized or ignored", including:

"the treatment of dark-triad constructs as unidimensional, contrary to evidence for their multidimensionality ... the indistinctness between current measures of Machiavellianism and psychopathy ... the use of multivariate statistical approaches that pose statistical and interpretive difficulties ... failure to test dark-triad relations directly against one another; and ... methodological concerns related to convenience sampling and reliance on mono-method approaches."

Other researchers have blamed "sloppy psychologists rather than fundamental weaknesses with the idea" and argue that "psychopathy and Machiavellianism can both be accurately measured by the dark triad."

Delroy Paulhus has rejected Miller's criticisms, claiming that they "can be made of any personality scale," and that he and other researchers "resent its popularity". However, he has conceded that "lots of research on the dark triad out there is less than stellar."

The terminology behind the dark triad construct has received criticism for being stigmatizing, sensationalistic, and potentially offensive.

== See also ==
- Macdonald triad
- Malignant narcissism
