= Dark Factor of Personality =

Psychological trait

The Dark (or D) Factor of Personality is a basic psychological personality trait and thus relatively consistent across situations and stable across time. Elevated levels in D predispose individuals towards a broad range of socially and ethically aversive thoughts and behaviors, such as aggression, bullying, cheating, crime, stealing, vandalism, violence, and many others.

== Definition ==
D is defined as the tendency to "maximize one's individual utility — disregarding, accepting, or malevolently provoking disutility for others —, accompanied by beliefs that serve as justifications". Utility refers to the extent to which individuals achieve their goals, and disutility is the extent to which goal-achievement is hindered. Goals can be more or less tangible (e.g. money, status, or power vs. excitement, joy, or pleasure). Whereas aiming to achieve one's goals is an aspect of normal psychological functioning, individuals with elevated levels in D will be inclined to harm other individuals or groups in pursuing their goals, i.e., they will cause disutility on others. For example, stealing something causes financial disutility, bullying someone causes psychological disutility, and hurting someone causes physiological disutility. Individuals high in D might even experience own utility (such as excitement) from disutility inflicted on others (such as pain).

In order to maintain a positive (moral) self-image despite engaging in aversive or malevolent behavior towards others, high-D individuals hold beliefs that they deem suited to justify their behavior. Such beliefs include, for instance, considering oneself (or one's group) as superior and entitled, endorsing ideologies favoring dominance of individuals or groups, viewing the world as a dangerous place and competitive jungle, believing that others are stupid or somehow losers and, in turn, deserve to be exploited, and many more. These beliefs allow individuals high in D to act in ways that harm others without feelings of guilt or remorse, and thereby contribute to the maintenance of malevolent behavior.

== Relation to other aversive traits ==
According to the D theory, D reflects the basic disposition underlying any aversive trait (such as Machiavellianism, narcissism, or psychopathy), which are regarded as specific expressions ("flavored manifestations") of D. As a consequence, D reflects what all aversive traits have in common, i.e., the aversive part of any trait. This implies that any aversive trait comprises the features of D, but also potentially other components that are largely unrelated to D and are thus not aversive as such. For example, psychopathy is aversive because it reflects D to some extent, but it additionally comprises features related to disinhibition or impulsivity, which – in isolation - do not systematically lead to aversive behavior. However, combined with D (determining whether aversive behavior occurs), impulsivity co-determines how and under which conditions such behavior is displayed.

== Relation to other non-aversive traits ==
The D factor has a r=0.63 correlation with low HEXACO Honesty-Humility, and the two concepts have been called "strongly overlapping, yet functionally different and nomologically distinct constructs".

== Measurement ==
D is usually measured relying on self-reports. Because D is assumed to be responsible for the occurrence of aversive behavior, it will be reflected in all indicators used to assess aversive traits, albeit to varying degrees. However, although the indicators of any particular aversive trait will also reflect D, measuring D itself requires the inclusion of a sufficiently large number of diverse indicators in order to capture the full theoretical breadth that D represents. Thus, item sets that allow for a reliable and valid assessment of D have been compiled and are available in many languages, and also as an online self-assessment.
