= Machiavellianism (psychology) =

Personality construct

Machiavellianism is one of the traits in the dark triad model, along with psychopathy and narcissism.

In the field of personality psychology, Machiavellianism (sometimes abbreviated as MACH) is the name of a personality trait construct characterized by manipulativeness, indifference to morality, lack of empathy, and a calculated focus on self-interest. Psychologists Richard Christie and Florence L. Geis created the construct in the 1960s. They devised a set of statements to study variations in human behaviors and named it after Niccolò Machiavelli. The construct has no relation to the historical figure outside of bearing his name. Their Mach IV test, a 20-question, Likert-scale personality survey, became the standard self-assessment tool and scale of the Machiavellianism construct. Those who score high on the scale (High Machs) are more likely to have a high level of deceitfulness, exploitativeness and a cold, unemotional temperament.

It is one of the dark triad traits, along with the subclinical versions of narcissism and psychopathy.

== Origin of the construct ==
=== The creation of a manipulation scale ===
In 1955, psychologist Richard Christie set out to study the thought processes and actions of those who manipulated others, such as political ideologues and religious extremists. He found that there was much literature on those who followed organizations and movements, but very little on those who led them. He began by conceptualizing what qualities a potential manipulator would have, such as a lack of empathy and affect, and being unconcerned with moral standards. Then as Christie was developing a psychometric for interpersonal manipulation, he thought it necessary to utilize the style of the various authors he was researching to better suit the needs of the construction of the test. In the 1960s, Christie and his colleagues would then develop a test using a selection of their own statements which they viewed were discriminatory enough to measure personality differences, naming the construct "Machiavellianism". They wanted to assess whether or not those who were in agreement with the statements would behave differently than others who disagreed, specifically in regards to manipulative actions. Christie and his research partner Florence L. Geis published their results in their book, titled "Studies in Machiavellianism", in 1970.

The test items used were their own statements which they viewed Machiavelli could say, and were not direct statements from his works.

=== On the name of the scale ===
While the construct is named "Machiavellianism", it does not refer to the political theory espoused in Machiavelli's books (also called Machiavellianism). Because the two concepts share the same name, they can be confused for and conflated with one another, even though his political ideas are not relevant to psychology. Scholars have asserted that the variable has no relation to Machiavelli outside of bearing his name, and that it has nothing to do with Machiavelli's politics. Christie himself makes clear that he used sentences inspired by Machiavelli's works only as a sort of litmus test to study deceptive and manipulative behavior, and that his concern was not with Machiavelli's historical or political influence, stating specifically that:

Historians disagree as to whether Machiavelli was a cynic who wrote political satire, a patriot, or the first modern political scientist. The present concern is not with Machiavelli as an historic figure, but as the source of ideas about those who manipulate others.

Christie stated that he chose the name "Machiavellianism" out of convenience seeing as other names such as "M scale" (M for manipulation) and "Ma scale" (which was used by the Minnesota Multiphasic Personality Inventory for hypomania) were taken. Names also considered were the "manipulator" or "operator" scale, but these terms had issues regarding behavioral validity. He also accepts that by using the name "Machiavellianism", the scale would "create problems of public misunderstanding" due to the pre-existing political meaning of the term. In a later essay, Christie even states that some have viewed the name problematic and that "the use of the word Machiavellianism to describe the content of the scales has been questioned". Many have called for the concept to be renamed entirely.

=== MACH-IV ===
Christie and Geis's MACH IV test, a 20-question, Likert-scale personality survey, became the standard self-report tool to measure one's level of Machiavellianism. Those who score highly on the scale are classified as high Machs, while those who score low are classified as low Machs. "Machiavellian" is also used but has a far more technical use in this context, and has been adopted by psychologists to refer to this scale and those who score high on it. Using their scale, Christie and Geis conducted multiple experimental tests that showed that the interpersonal approaches and behavior of "high Machs" and "low Machs" differ. People scoring high on the scale tend to endorse manipulative statements, and behave accordingly, contrary to those who score lowly. People scoring high on the scale tend to endorse statements such as, "Never tell anyone the real reason you did something unless it is useful to do so," (No. 1) but not ones like, "Most people are basically good and kind" (No. 4), "There is no excuse for lying to someone else" (No. 7) or "Most people who get ahead in the world lead clean, moral lives" (No. 11) Their basic results have been widely replicated. Measured on the Mach IV scale, males score, on average, slightly higher on Machiavellianism than females.

The Mach IV test influenced the creation of an assessment called the Dirty Dozen, which contains 12 items, and the Short Dark Triad, composed of 27 items. The MACH-IV (and other Machiavellianism tests) also feature questions loosely inspired by other thinkers such as Chinese political authors.

High vs Low Machiavellianism

Like all personality traits, Machiavellianism is a characteristic that exists on a spectrum or continuum. Christie and others noted that High Machs were more likely to cheat in experimental games, manipulate others around them, and were generally detached in their interactions. This was opposed to the behavior of Low Machs, who found such behaviors immoral, and refrained from them.

The higher a person is on the Machiavellianism scale, the more likely they are to deceive and exploit at the expense of someone else, engage in unprincipled behavior, and have a lack of empathetic feelings.

== Core features ==
In developing the construct, Christie theorized that a "manipulator" or "operator" would possess the following characteristics:

1. A relative lack of affect in interpersonal relationships: Manipulators do not empathize with their victims. The more empathy one has, Christie says, the less likely one will manipulate a person to do their bidding.

2. A lack of concern for conventional morality: Christie asserts that the manipulator is not concerned with the morality of behaviors such as lying and cheating.

3. A lack of gross psychopathology: Christie states that manipulators usually have an instrumentalist view of the world, which shows a lack of psychosis or other mental impairments.

4. Low ideological commitment: Manipulators prefer to focus on getting things done pragmatically rather than focus on ideological allegiances. Christie states that while manipulators are to be found in organizations of differing ideals, they are more likely to be interested in tactics that achieve individual ends than inflexible idealistic ones.

=== Five-Factor Model ===
Under the Five-Factor Model of Machiavellianism, three characteristics underlie the construct:

- Antagonism: manipulativeness, cynicism, selfishness, callousness, and arrogance.
- Planfulness: deliberation and orderliness.
- Agency: achievement-striving, assertiveness, self-confidence, emotional invulnerability, activity and competence.

== Causes ==
=== Genetics and upbringing ===
Several behavioral genetics studies have shown that Machiavellianism has both significantly genetic and environmental influences. Researchers have noted that while Machiavellianism is heritable to a substantial degree, it can also be influenced by the shared-environment (i.e. sibling groups) slightly more than narcissism and psychopathy. Other traits associated with Machiavellianism are influenced by genetics as well, as one study notes that "The co-occurrence of alexithymia and Machiavellianism was most heavily influenced by genetic factors, and to a lesser but significant extent by non-shared environmental factors." Machiavellianism is also heavily correlated with primary psychopathy which is itself strongly heritable. A study on the "core" of dark triad traits also emphasized that the residual traits of Machiavellianism had "significant genetic components". The relationship between Machiavellianism and mental toughness is also moderated by environmental factors and a genetic basis.

One particular study found a gene responsible for dopamine reception was positively associated with individuals who scored high on the MACH IV, but it is unclear what specific mechanisms cause this effect. A study noted that the emotionality of Machiavellianism may also be genetically determined, with the authors stating that "it can be expected that in the case of Machiavellianism, the genetic influence may manifest itself by affecting the emotional sphere. That affective insensitivity – as McIlwain (2003) designates it--makes Machiavellians similar to psychopaths. In the study by Vernon et al (2008), genetic factors for Machiavellianism and psychopathy were correlated, which suggests that the variability of both qualities is greatly affected by the same genes. The genetically determined "cool syndrome" makes it easier for the child to use effective manipulation, leading to the development of a permanent behaviour strategy, at the same time protecting the child from internal punishments such as shame or guilt."

Studies have found a link between Machiavellianism and a blunted cortisol awaking response (CAR). A person's cortisol awaking response has been associated with a lack of affective empathy, and is highly heritable.

Environmental causes

The environmental causes (such as shared, and non-shared environment) that contribute to the development of machiavellianism were childhood maltreatment and neglect, social reinforcement of manipulative behaviors from an early age, and poor family functioning. One study even stated that "the etiology of Machiavellianism, similarly to the development of a dismissing-avoidant pattern, partly originates from childhood experiences obtained in relationships with unexpressive, less understanding, highly punitive or restrictive caregivers". In many studies, Machiavellianism has been heavily correlated with negative home atmospheres, loneliness, and adverse parental experiences. One study noted that punishment specifically led to the "emergence of deceitful and exploitative interpersonal tactics." The authors of the study concluded that these results "might give further support for the idea that Machiavellian personality traits are possible strategic responses to childhood adversities". Another study found the traits of Machiavellianism to be a response to early maladaptive schemas (EMS), essentially coping mechanisms for emotional deprivation, mistrust, abuse, and caregiver rejection. Irregular parent care, such as a mother being neglectful and a father being overprotective, has also been correlated with Machiavellianism. The hereditary influence on Machiavellianism may make it challenging to disentangle the genetic underpinnings from the effects of parental upbringing and environmental factors. Another study also echoed similarly that it is difficult to separate genetic contributions from parenting environments, and that "negative fathers might be high on Machiavellian traits and therefore, the transmission might be genetic rather than experiential".

In general, Jones (2020) asserts that "there may be a myriad of reasons, including some environmental reasons, as to why someone would become cynical, habitually ignore morality, or use manipulative persuasion. There may be others who are born cynical, manipulative, and amoral. Thus, there may be differences in etiology that lead to differences in how fixed the trait is, and how it is expressed".

=== Machiavellianism in children ===
Ever since the creation of the construct in the 1960s, there has been extensive research on Machiavellianism in young children and adolescents, via a measure dubbed the "Kiddie Mach" test. The first study was done in 1966 as a part of Dorothea Braginsky's doctoral dissertation, with the subjects being as young as 10 years old. Studies have shown that traits of Machiavellianism and other dark triad traits were already present in preschool children, and more pronounced in adolescents aged 11–17. There have been studies to measure Machiavellianism in 6 year olds using adult informants to analyze the child's behavior. Deceptive behaviors by children even as young as 3 were also investigated heavily. Peer reports suggest that children higher in Machiavellianism exhibit behaviors such as using both prosocial and coercive approaches based on how much is to be gained in a situation, and they tend to manipulate indirectly. Children who score highly on the Machiavellianism scale tend to be more successful in manipulation, do it more frequently, and are judged as better at manipulation than those who score lower. Parental levels of Machiavellianism seem to have a slight effect on the child's own level. Machiavellianism levels in fathers was positively correlated with the Machiavellianism levels of their children, but the mother's level had no significant effect. One study concluded that "parental Machiavellianism is a predictor and perhaps a cause of children's Machiavellian beliefs and their manipulative success". Machiavellianism is also correlated with childhood aggression, especially concerning the control of social hierarchies. One study found a trend upwards with respect to Machiavellianism from late childhood to adolescence, when levels of Machiavellianism are thought to peak. From adolescence throughout adulthood there is a significant and steady downward trend with regard to levels of Machiavellianism, until the age of 65 where an overall lifetime minimum is reached.

Peer ratings of children high on Machiavellianism are inconsistent, with some researchers reporting that juvenile High Machs are rated as popular, and some reporting that they are less well liked by peers. A study involving Greek children ages 8–12 noted that the children highest in Machiavellianism showed aggressive tendencies and were more likely to bully others, though the tactics varied by gender.

== Dark triad ==
In 1998, John McHoskey, William Worzel, and Christopher Szyarto proposed that narcissism, Machiavellianism, and psychopathy are more or less interchangeable in normal samples. Delroy L. Paulhus and McHoskey debated these perspectives at an American Psychological Association conference, inspiring a body of research that continues to grow in the published literature. Delroy Paulhus and Kevin Williams found enough differences between the traits to suggest that they were distinct despite their similarities, thus the concept of a "triad" of offensive personality traits was conceptualized. There has been research on Machiavellianism using various dark triad measures, including the Short Dark Triad (SD3), and the Dark Triad Dirty Dozen test.

Miller, Lynam, and Sharpe (2022) state that the reason why the multidimensional nature of Machiavellianism has "received less attention" is because there is "little research on Machiavellianism outside the context of the D3".

=== Psychopathy ===
Many psychologists consider Machiavellianism to be essentially indistinguishable from psychopathy, as they both share manipulative tendencies, disregard for morality, and cold callousness as their primary attributes. There is an immense and ongoing debate amongst researchers as to whether or not Machiavellianism and psychopathy should be treated as the same construct, or at least treat Machiavellianism as a subset of psychopathy. When tested, High Machs scored consistently high on measures of psychopathy, more than Low Machs. Primary psychopaths also scored higher on the Machiavellianism scale than secondary psychopaths. According to John McHoskey, the MACH-IV test is merely "a global measure of psychopathy in noninstitutionalized populations", and that this is a result of the disconnect between clinical and personality psychology. Many have stated that the Machiavellianism scale measures nothing more than "successful" psychopathy, or psychopathy without the extreme clinical characteristics. Even compared to other "dark" traits, research has shown that Psychopathy correlates with Machiavellianism far more than it correlates with narcissism. Some authors have stated that Machiavellianism and psychopathy represent the issue of a jangle fallacy, as both constructs are named differently yet describe the same concept. A 2022 paper stated that Machiavellianism "is theoretically distinct from psychopathy, but empirically they are nearly indistinguishable". Beverly Fehr even suggested that psychopaths may be simply "High Machs who have had run up against the law". Robert Hare, author of the Psychopathy Checklist, stated that Machiavellianism is more closely related to PCL Factor 1, affective detachment, than to Factor 2, an antisocial lifestyle. According to Christopher Patrick, high Psychopathy Checklist scores correlated with much higher Machiavellianism scores, as well as higher scores on boldness and aggressiveness.

Researchers note that Machiavellianism is well represented in every measure of psychopathy, such as the Factor 1 characteristics on the Psychopathy Checklist, more specifically traits such as "conning/manipulative", "pathological lying," "callous/lack of empathy", and "glibness/superficial charm". Donald Lynam and others noted that Machiavellianism is also represented in the "Interpersonal Manipulation" factor in Hare's Self-Report Psychopathy Scale-III and in the "Manipulation" scale in the Elemental Psychopathy Assessment. The researchers state that "ultimately, measures of psychopathy and MACH appear to be measuring the same construct, and MACH assessments fail to capture the construct as articulated in theoretical descriptions". Michael Levenson, author of the Levenson Self-Report Psychopathy Scale, disagreed with the notion of distinguishing machiavellianism from psychopathy, stating that it "does not accord" with empirical research which shows Machiavellianism being heavily related to primary psychopathy. Machiavellianism has a strong relationship with both primary and secondary psychopathy on Levenson's self report test. In experiments High Machs also scored highly on the Psychopathic Deviate subscale on the MMPI. On the Psychopathic Personality Inventory, created by Scott Lilienfeld and Brian Andrews, there is even a subscale similarly named "Machiavellian Egocentricity". The subscale is said to assess a "ruthless and self centered willingness to exploit others". Machiavellianism and psychopathy have both been negatively correlated with the recognition of facial emotions, with one study stating that "if the ability to recognise facial expressions is exclusively an affective empathy task, it indeed accounts for the facial recognition deficits found in primary psychopathy and Machiavellianism." High scores on the Triarchic Psychopathy Measure questionnaire (especially the "Meanness" subscale) strongly correlated with Machiavellianism. One group of researchers noted that by definition, "the interpersonal features of psychopathy involve a calculating, cunning, and manipulative style" thus a highly psychopathic person is ipso facto also a person high on Machiavellianism.

Machiavellianism and psychopathy overlap so heavily that researchers have proposed merging the two traits into each other, preferably incorporating Machiavellianism into psychopathy. There have been attempts to combine Machiavellianism and psychopathy into one construct, such as the creation of a "Dark Dyad" as opposed to a "Dark Triad", with the exclusion of narcissism.

A 2019 study done on criminal psychopaths noted that Machiavellianism showed the strongest association with the affective aspect of psychopathy.

==== Difference between constructs:Impulse control ====
Many other psychologists state that while Machiavellianism and psychopathy overlap heavily, there is much evidence to suggest that they are distinct personality constructs. Psychologists who stress the differences between Machiavellianism and psychopathy state that, in total contrast to high Machs, psychopaths are impulsive, tend to be reckless, and lack long term planning skills. Delroy Paulhus and others have stated that this difference between the two traits is often underappreciated. Scholars also note that those high on Machiavellianism can delay gratification, and have more sensitivity to punishment and awareness of consequences than psychopaths. Though both traits have a heritable basis, Machiavellianism is more influenced by the environment than psychopathy. High Machs have been described as "master manipulators" and far better at manipulation than psychopaths and narcissists.

Daniel Jones notes that even though both psychopaths and High Machs share a manipulative and callous nature, the difference between Machiavellianism and psychopathy lies in the type of manipulation employed by the two constructs. Machiavellianism is marked by cautious planning, and manipulating only when something is to be gained, while psychopathy is marked by rashness, and manipulating regardless of situation. O'Boyle and others found however that the notion that Machiavellianism is marked by cautiousness does not match empirical research which shows that it can be correlated with reckless behavior in certain situations.

In response to this interpretation, Miller et al (2017) responded by saying that empirical research casts "substantial doubt" on the notion of Machiavellianism being distinguishable from psychopathy, and that ultimately literature on Machiavellianism should be framed as an alternative literature on psychopathy, as they view that Machiavellianism literature is far more helpful in understanding psychopathy.

=== Narcissism ===
Individuals high in Machiavellianism and narcissism both manipulate to improve their reputations, and how they appear to others. Individuals high in the two traits do this as a form of self aggrandizement to help their chances of success in a given situation. Machiavellianism scores were positively associated with aspects of narcissism such as entitlement and exploitativeness, and inversely associated with adaptive narcissistic tendencies, like self-sufficiency. Studies have also shown that those higher on Machiavellianism are more realistic about their character, while narcissists are less realistic about theirs. Compared to High Machs, narcissists are less malevolent and show a more socially positive personality. They also have higher levels of self-rated happiness.

Machiavellianism and narcissism both share a lack of empathy and a focus on self-interest, though the two traits differ in how they manifest in people, and what their motivations are. High Machs have tendencies to be driven by personal gain, whereas narcissists are driven by a need for validation and admiration. Opposed to those high on narcissism, High Machs tend to have better self control, are less impulsive and are more self-serving their interpersonal interactions, while narcissists may be more impulsive and attention-seeking.

In terms of social relationships, High Machs are more likely to be more exploitative towards others, while narcissists may be more likely to seek out relationships that serve to bolster their self-esteem and provide them with the admiration they desire.

Compared to subclinical narcissists, High Machs exhibit a greater lack of empathy, because of the emotional deficiencies inherent within Machiavellianism.

=== White collar crime ===
Research has shown that individuals high in Machiavellianism may be more willing to engage in white collar crimes. Psychologist Daniel Jones has stated that "individuals higher on Machiavellianism are well suited for crimes in the financial world, especially crimes that skirt the legal system". Delroy Paulhus has stated that Machiavellianism is the main trait for white collar criminals and con artists, and not psychopathy, stating that:

Although direct research on this topic is difficult, it seems clear that malevolent stockbrokers such as Bernie Madoff do not qualify as psychopaths: They are corporate Machiavellians who use deliberate, strategic procedures for exploiting others. A genuine psychopath, even at the subclinical level, lacks the self-control to orchestrate the schemes of a shrewd stockbroker.

In a research paper, Daniel Jones and others stated that a person high on Machiavellianism would also be possibly drawn to cybercrime, noting that "although we did not directly assess crimes, we did find patterns of system infiltration that were different among the three traits, with Machiavellianism being associated with the stealthiest approach among the three traits." They also stated that Machiavellianism would only be associated with crime if the "benefits outweighed the risks". They went on to clarify that this is opposed to individuals high in psychopathy, whom are prone to crime regardless of the situation.

=== Other "dark" groupings ===
Machiavellianism has been featured in many other groupings of dark traits, such as the dark tetrad, which adds sadism to the dark triad traits. The characteristics of Machiavellianism have also been viewed as potentially correlated with sadism.

The paper titled "The Dark Core of Personality" introduced a theoretical framework to understand various "dark traits" in personality as manifestations of a single underlying factor called the Dark Factor of Personality. This factor represents a general dispositional tendency where individuals prioritize their own utility (self-interest) at the expense of others, often justifying their actions through certain beliefs. The concept of D encapsulates all of the main "dark traits", with the addition of Spitefulness, Egoism, Moral Disengagement, Entitlement, and Self-interest. The authors of the study argued that while Machiavellianism, along with other dark traits like Narcissism and Psychopathy, has its unique features, it also shares a common core with these traits, which is encapsulated in the D factor. This means that people who score high in Machiavellianism tend to exhibit behaviors that prioritize their own benefit over others' which correlate with characteristics that align with the D factor. It is said that manipulativeness and callousness is responsible for the covariances among the dark personalities in general.

The light triad is a personality model that contrasts the dark triad, which comprises Kantianism, faith in humanity, and humanism. Kantianism was compared to Machiavellianism as its opposite, as it is characterized by a non-exploitative orientation. Both Kantianism and Machiavellianism are traits which are tongue-in-cheek references to philosophers. The "Light Triad" and its characteristics were most strongly negatively correlated with Machiavellianism.

== DSM: Trait, not disorder ==
Machiavellianism has never been considered a disorder, nor has it been referenced in any version of the Diagnostic and Statistical Manual of Mental Disorders or International Classification of Diseases. It has always been treated solely as a personality construct. It is primarily studied by personality psychologists, as it is a non-clinical personality style.

== Relations with other personality traits ==
There is immense literature concerning the relationships between Machiavellianism and other personality dimensions, such as the traits in the Big Five trait model. Machiavellianism has also been related to interpersonal aggression and hostile behavior.

=== Big Five ===
Mach-IV scores are negatively correlated with agreeableness (r = −0.47) and conscientiousness (r = −0.34), two dimensions of the Big Five personality model (NEO-PI-R). The FFMI corrects for this by including aspects of high conscientiousness in the scale (e.g. order, deliberation). Additionally, Machiavellianism correlates more highly with the honesty-humility dimension of the six-factor HEXACO model than with any of the big five dimensions. Machiavellianism has also been located within the interpersonal circumplex, which consists of the two independent dimensions of agency and communion. Agency refers to the motivation to succeed and to individuate the self, whereas communion refers to the motivation to merge with others and to support group interests. Machiavellianism lies in the quadrant of the circumplex defined by high agency and low communion. Machiavellianism has been found to lie diagonally opposite from a circumplex construct called self-construal, a tendency to prefer communion over agency. This suggests that people high in Machiavellianism do not simply wish to achieve, they wish to do so at the expense of (or at least without regard to) others.

=== Hot and cold empathy ===
There are two distinct types of empathy which people use to relate to each other which are referred to as hot and cold empathy. Cold empathy (or cognitive empathy) refers to the understanding of how others might react to one's actions or a certain event. Hot empathy (or emotional/affective empathy) refers to the emotional reaction others might have to the emotions of another person. Machiavellianism was consistently negatively correlated with affective empathy in practically every study. Machiavellianism was also negatively correlated with affective resonance (feeling good when others feel good) and positively associated with affective dissonance (e.g. feeling happy when others are sad). People high in Machiavellianism tend to have a better understanding of cold empathy and do not feel hot empathy which explains why they seem cold and uncaring. Research results have also suggested that High Machs are deficient only at the level of affective empathy (sharing of emotions), whereas their cognitive empathy is intact, even high. Another study suggested that high Machs are deficient at both kinds of empathy. Studies also assert that high Machs do not feel guilt or remorse over the consequences of their manipulations. High Machs are less likely to be altruistic, and they are less likely to be concerned with the problems of others. High Machs are also less emotionally expressive and have a hard time recognizing and understanding the emotional states of others. One study proposed that High Machs have more automatic (that is, unconscious) recognition of other's negative emotions more than low Machs, and though they don't internalize these feelings, the understanding of those emotions may in fact aid in the manipulation of others. Children who scored higher on Machiavellianism showed a lack of empathy and more delinquent behaviors compared to those who scored lower, such as a lack of guilt, lying, cheating, and truancy. A 2025 study concluded that "by and large, Machiavellianism was more strongly negatively related to affective empathy".

Some authors have stated that since Machiavellianism is so diametrically opposed to empathy, it should be included in empathy scales as the polar opposite. Total scores on Machiavellianism and empathy were "significantly negatively correlated".

=== Unemotionality ===
One of the primary traits of machiavellianism is a detached, unemotional attitude and lack of affect in regards to others. Christie and Geis noted that the primary difference between high machs and low machs was the degree of emotion invested in interpersonal relations, with those scoring high having the lowest. Research has been done on the extent of the low emotionality of those who score high on the Machiavellianism scale. Doris Mcllwain noted that "Machiavellians do not inhabit the realm of emotion in the same way as others, yet they use it to manipulate others. They do not experience feelings, empathy, or morality in normative ways. yet they are consummate manipulators and deceivers precisely by playing upon these sentiments and convictions in others. Thus they induce in others the guilt they hardly feel themselves." A study done by Farah Ali and others noted that Machiavellianism seems to have emotional reactions to stimuli similar to primary psychopathy, differing only in higher levels of anxiety, which those who score highly on machiavellianism may be prone to. Machiavellianism has an unclear relation with anxiety levels, some researchers have found positive correlations, while some have found no relation at all. High Machs demonstrate reduced skills in expressing their emotions.

A 2014 analysis discovered that, in addition to acting for mostly self interest and profit, High Machs used significantly less words when referring to emotional involvement. They concluded that "this study confirmed previous findings that High Machs have a cool and rational character and a pro-self orientation and showed that their lack of group orientation may account for their low cooperation in social dilemmas."

Alexithymia is also considered a key trait that has correlations with Machiavellianism. It is the lack of awareness of one's own emotions as well as the emotions of others. When tested, healthy alexithymic individuals have been found to obtain high Machiavellianism scores. This was not surprising to researchers, seeing as the unemotionality of Machiavellianism shows similarities to what alexithymics experience. One study examined the relationship between alexithymia and endorsement of beliefs associated with Machiavellianism amongst university students. Results showed a positive correlation between alexithymia and exploitative beliefs, suggesting those with higher levels of alexithymia were more likely to endorse the view that manipulating others is an effective way to satisfy their motives.

=== Neuroticism and depression ===
Researchers have often debated the potential links between Machiavellianism and a neurotic, anxious disposition. In a study done by psychologists Hans Eysenck, his wife Sybil, and John Allsopp, they note that they found "virtually no relationship" between Machiavellianism and neuroticism, unlike the relationships they found with Machiavellianism and Extraversion-Psychoticism respectively. However John McHoskey found links between Machiavellianism and neuroticism, along with the other personality traits popularized by Eysenck. Studies using measures of the Big Five personality traits have variously found positive or no correlation between Machiavellianism and Neuroticism.

Machiavellianism has very scant correlations with depression, and the higher one's Machiavellianism score was, the lower their depression level was. One study even noted that depressed males "were significantly less Machiavellian than were nondepressed males". They then estimate that "depression in males, then, may be of a more self-aggressive, self-destructive nature". High Machs who have higher levels of emotional intelligence scores show less depressive symptoms.

=== Motivation ===
A 1992 review described the motivation of those high on the Machiavellianism scale as related to cold selfishness and pure instrumentality, and those high on the trait were assumed to pursue their motives (e.g. sex, achievement, sociality) in duplicitous ways. Research on the motivations of high Machs compared to low Machs found that they gave high priority to money, success, and competition and relatively low priority to community building, self-love, and family commitment. High Machs admitted to focusing on unmitigated achievement and winning at any cost. The research on behaviors which high Machs engage in suggest that they are willing to achieve their goals by bending and breaking rules, cheating, and stealing. People high in Machiavellianism are able to easily switch between working with others to taking advantage of others to achieve their goals, and they are more willing to do things others see as terrible or immoral.

=== Intelligence and other cognitive skills ===
Due to their skill at interpersonal manipulation, there has often been an assumption that high Machs possess superior intelligence, or ability to understand other people in social situations. A 2018 study provided some support for this assumption. However, other research has established that Machiavellianism is unrelated to IQ. Paulhus and Williams found "significant associations of psychopathy and Machiavellianism with a relatively higher nonverbal to verbal IQ score".

Studies on emotional intelligence have usually found that high Machiavellianism is associated with low emotional intelligence as assessed by both performance and questionnaire measures.

Research has examined the relationship between trait emotional intelligence (EI), Machiavellianism, and the personality trait of agreeableness. The findings of one paper revealed that while trait EI and the ability to manage others' emotions were negatively correlated with Machiavellianism, this relationship was mediated by agreeableness. Specifically, those high in trait EI tended to be low in Machiavellianism primarily because they were high in agreeableness, reflecting a cooperative and prosocial nature. One study found that Machiavellianism was negatively associated with most facets of socio-emotional intelligence (SEI), including social expressivity, social sensitivity, emotional expressivity, and emotional sensitivity. However, Machiavellianism showed no significant relationship with emotional control, which involves regulating one's own emotional displays. Machiavellianism was positively associated with emotional manipulation, the tendency to underhandedly influence others' emotions. Despite this association, Machiavellianism did not moderate the relationship between any facet of SEI and emotional manipulation. This suggests that while High Machs have a propensity for emotionally manipulative behavior, they may not be utilizing socio-emotional skills towards that end. The authors propose this could be due to the High Mach's externally-oriented and unemotional perspective.

Both emotional empathy and emotion recognition have been shown to have negative correlations with Machiavellianism. Additionally, research has shown that Machiavellianism is unrelated to a more advanced theory of mind, that is, the ability to anticipate what others are thinking in social situations. However, research results have suggested the contrary viewpoint that high Machiavellianism is associated with excellent theory of mind skills.

When it comes to manipulation, individuals high in Machiavellianism may, according to Bereczkei, "have certain cognitive and social skills that enable them to properly adapt to the challenges of environmental circumstances". They also are incredibly perceptive to the presence of others, and are able to feign altruism to enhance their reputation. A study published in 2023 investigated whether Machiavellianism is associated with the production of "bullshit", which is defined as inaccurate or meaningless information intended to impress, persuade or mislead. The researchers found that the manipulative aspect of Machiavellianism (Machiavellian approach) was linked to "persuasive bullshitting", aimed at gaining desired resources. The distrustful aspect (Machiavellian avoidance) was associated with "evasive bullshitting", spreading vague information to prevent disadvantages. Those high in Machiavellian avoidance were even better at distinguishing misinformation from valuable information.

=== Neurological studies ===
There have been few studies on the neural correlates of Machiavellianism. Research has shown that Machiavellianism has been correlated with changes in gray matter in the areas of the basal ganglia, left prefrontal cortex, bilaterally in the insula, and in the right hippocampus and the left parahippocampal gyrus. Researcher Tamas Bereczkei stated that the manipulation skill in High Machs is associated with neural correlates that are responsible for decision making. He also noted that behaviors associated with Machiavellianism need to "recruit more neural resources than a honest behavior, especially when manipulators face a cooperative partner as a potential victim. Machiavellians have to inhibit the norm of reciprocity and, additionally, generate an opposite response." Machiavellianism has also been linked with lesions in the left dorsolateral prefrontal cortex. Frontal dysfunction was also linked with Machiavellianism. Daniel Jones also concluded that those who score high on Machiavellianism have the "neurological structure of a strategic manipulator". The activation of the task-positive network (TPN) and the default mode network (DMN) have also been associated with a lack of genuine empathy, and also have been observed in Machiavellianism. Research has linked regional gray matter volume in the left superior frontal gyrus to both Machiavellianism and social aggression, which is "intentional antisocial behavior directed to damage others' social reputations or interpersonal relationships through socially manipulative tactics".

== Social relationships ==
The effects that one's level of Machiavellianism has on a person's socialization and interpersonal relationships, such as friendships and romantic relationships, has been studied extensively. High Machs are highly likely to ingratiate themselves within social groups via compliments and conforming their opinions to those around them. High Machs are more than likely to choose better quality friends, as they have a better time at guessing who is a good person and thus more pliable for manipulation. Machiavellianism was also correlated with withdrawal and avoidance in romantic relationships. Individuals high in all dark triad traits find it easy to end relationships, and tend to prefer short-term relationships over long term ones. Studies done on courtship showed that women higher on machiavellianism tend to go on dates not for sexual reasons but for free food, a phenomenon known as a "foodie call". Because a lack of empathy and affect with regards to others is one of the main features of Machiavellianism, individuals high on the trait tend to act in a utilitarian, self interested manner, prefer emotionally detached relationships, and are not concerned with the other person's needs. High machs report lower relationship satisfaction than those lower on the scale. Though there has been research on the potential "attractiveness" of the dark triad traits, out of all of the traits in the dark triad, Machiavellianism was the least attractive to the opposite sex. One of the studies concluded that "The third DT trait, Machiavellianism, was significantly negatively associated with being chosen and mate appeal for STR (short term relationships) in women." Another study claimed that this was because high Machs tend to be way less extroverted than narcissists and psychopaths, and that "it is possible that individuals do not like cynical, manipulative, aggressive, remorseless, and duplicitous people such as Machiavellians and psychopaths".

Like the other dark triad traits, those high on Machiavellianism have been reportedly more willing to troll or flame others on the internet, however a 2021 study found no particularly strong connection between trolling and dark personality traits. Machiavellianism has also been correlated with a higher than average belief in conspiracy theories. Because of their emphasis on hierarchy, high scorers in Machiavellianism were also found with higher levels of prejudice, and higher social dominance orientation scores.

=== Gender differences ===
Research has consistently shown that men score higher than women in Machiavellianism. There is evidence to suggest that Machiavellianism is represented differently in both sexes, with men being more opportunistic, self confident, and willing to take risks, while women higher in Machiavellianism are more likely to be avoidant and have anxious features. While only psychopathy was an indicator of future infidelity amongst men, both psychopathy and Machiavellianism were predictors amongst women. The findings of one research paper showed that men, but not women, high in Machiavellianism were non-impulsive and high in planning, which suggests that the apparent impulsivity of Machiavellianism may be a question of gender. Peter Jonason suggested that the reason why men score much higher than women in dark triad traits is because men require less emotional connection in order to get ahead in life.

=== Cross-cultural studies ===
There have been many studies on how Machiavellianism is presented in people from different countries and with different cultures. Multiple studies found that in nearly all countries, men scored higher than women in Machiavellianism, and that the gender differences were notable. The populations of many other countries varied from their western counterparts in their levels of dark triad traits overall, which the authors of one study attributed to sociopolitical factors and levels of economic engagement. In another cross cultural study, Machiavellianism also showed associations with limited interactive or normative values. A study investigated the relationship between emotion recognition and dark personality traits (including Machiavellianism) across cultures. The effects were gender and culture-dependent. Among both German males and females, Machiavellianism showed strong positive associations with emotionally manipulative tactics. Some scholars noted an issue with many cross cultural studies on machiavellianism, primarily that "researchers have used measures of Machiavellianism (Mach IV) which were derived from Western concepts and which may not have similar meanings when applied to non-Western groups." High Machiavellianism scores were associated with higher levels of ethnocentrism, but the motivations were for self interest rather than genuine group loyalty.

=== Aggression and antisocial behavior ===
Machiavellianism has little association with the outright display of aggression. Those high in Machiavellianism tend to be more aggressive to short term as opposed to long-term partners. While Machiavellianism is associated with hostility, those high on the trait may mask it depending on the manipulation tactic used. Machiavellianism also is associated with the tuning of aggression to the benefit long-term objectives, only engaging in antisocial behavior when the stakes are low and it proffers benefits, unlike psychopathy and narcissism. In a study by Delroy Paulhus and Daniel Jones, High Machs were found to refrain from cheating under risky situations, preferring to sustain their reputation for the long term than to engage in short-term financial gain. The authors then state that High Machs may cheat under high risk scenarios, but only when "ego-depleted", which then makes their behavior appear similar to those of psychopaths. McHoskey found that MACH is associated with "cheating, divulging intimate sexual secrets to third parties, and both feigning love and inducing intoxication to secure sex". He also suggested that Machiavellianism is correlated with an extensive focus on financial gain, and is also correlated with antisocial behaviors such as stealing, vandalism, and cheating as opposed to prosocial actions like helping others.

== In the workplace ==
Machiavellianism is also studied by organizational psychologists, especially those who study manipulative behaviors in workplace settings. Workplace behaviors associated with this concept include flattery, deceit, coercion, and the abuse of others through one's position of leadership. These behaviors in the workplace are ultimately done to advance personal interests. Individuals scoring high in dark traits generally show mixed relations with workplace success, with some being successful, and some falling behind.

Individuals high in machiavellianism tend to gravitate towards particular careers, especially those that require a high degree of competitiveness needed to succeed. High Machs are ambitious enough to cut corners and use aggressive means if it is necessary to get ahead in their careers. It was shown that those high on Machiavellianism are more drawn to academic majors like economics, law, and politics, as opposed to the "person-oriented" majors like education, nursing, and social work that were associated with lower Machiavellianism scores.

High levels of Machiavellianism negatively affect subordinates' career success and well-being. Individuals high in MACH found it easier to obtain leadership positions, and a better salary. Machiavellianism was identified as a significant moderator in the relationship between perceptions of both adhocracy and hierarchy cultures and bullying victimization. The positive impact of ethical leadership can possibly be diminished with leaders who score highly on MACH.

== Scale evaluation ==
=== Dimensions of the MACH scale ===
Although there have been a multitude of proposed factor structures, two dimensions emerge most consistently within factor-analytic research which separates the views from the behaviors in Machiavellianism. Although many posit that the Mach IV scale is unable to reliably capture the two dimensions, a 10-item subset of the scale known as the "two-dimensional Mach IV" (TDM-V), reproduces the views and tactics dimensions across countries, genders, sample types, and scale category length. The "Views" dimension appears to capture the neurotic, narcissistic, pessimistic, and distrustful aspects of Machiavellianism, while the "Tactics" component captures the more unconscientious, self-serving, and deceitful behavioral aspects. In response to criticisms of the Mach-IV, in 2018 researchers developed the Five-Factor Machiavellianism Inventory (FFMI), which attempts to include concepts (like being calculated and planful) that are not adequately captured by the Mach-IV.

=== Construct validity and criticism ===
There has been debate on how valid Machiavellianism scales are in tapping the construct. It is often stated by those critical of Machiavellianism scales that it does not actually measure the theoretical trait, but something identical to psychopathy and narcissism. For example, it is often stated that Machiavellianism is marked by less impulsivity and better long term thinking as opposed to psychopathy, but some empirical research shows that even High Machs can act impulsive in certain scenarios. Lynam and others stated "we suggest that existing measures of Machiavellianism are functioning as proxy measures of psychopathy." Psychologist John Rauthmann viewed the MACH-IV as more of a measure of cynicism, and that it doesn't really capture other qualities of Machiavellianism.

Most of the research done on Machiavellianism has been done with either the Mach IV or Mach V, though the Mach V is no longer in use due to psychometric issues. Many have expressed concerns with the reliability of the Mach IV scale to capture all of the features of Machiavellianism, thus many proposals have been made in favor of other Machiavellianism scales.

John Rauthmann and others have stated that, while the MACH-IV is "a generally reliable and valid scale", it has its shortcomings. These include the response styles of the test takers, the varying factor structures, and "insufficient content and construct validity". The researchers developed their own scale instead to study Machiavellianism multidimensionally instead of unidimensionally to prevent the construct from becoming hard to study effectively. Psychologist Jason Dahling and others have created another measure of Machiavellianism, dubbed the Machiavellian Personality Scale (or MPS for short).

Daniel Jones has stated that the MACH IV, despite all of its merits, is an "outdated instrument" and "is not helping the field with precision". He ultimately states that it "should be replaced by assessments that are more precise reflections of the construct." Scholars note that there is a tendency to conflate the scale with Machiavelli's ideas, even though it has zero relation to the historical figure or his political works. Regarding the MACH-IV, scholars have stated that almost all of items on the scale attributed to Machiavelli do not come from him, with only one item (item 20) corresponding somewhat to his actual writings. Also, two items on the MACH-IV reference P.T. Barnum (born 1810) and voluntary euthanasia, both of which are unrelated to Machiavelli's ideas.

Researchers debating how to best measure Machiavellianism proposed an Avoidance Questionnaire (MAAQ), which separates strategic striving for advantage from misanthropically driven prevention of loss. In two German samples, both facets related as expected to disagreeableness, dominance seeking, and mistrust; however, the nomological networks of Machiavellianism Approach and subclinical psychopathy were nearly identical, indicating the MAAQ failed to sufficiently differentiate from psychopathy. A second study across Germany, Canada, the United Kingdom, and Serbia (ntotal = 1,853) showed partial scalar cross-national invariance, with Germans scoring lower in both facets than most other groups, supporting cross-national equivalence but undermining construct validity.

=== Application of the scale in other research ===
In 2002, the Machiavellianism scale of Christie and Geis was applied by behavioral game theorists Anna Gunnthorsdottir, Kevin McCabe and Vernon L. Smith in their search for explanations for specific behavior in experimental games, especially individual choices which do not correspond to assumptions of material self-interest captured by the standard Nash equilibrium prediction. It was found that in a trust game, those with high Mach-IV scores tended to follow Homo economicus' equilibrium strategies while those with low Mach-IV scores tended to deviate from the equilibrium, and instead made choices that reflected widely accepted moral standards and social preferences. In one study, Machiavellianism was positively associated with making economically opportunistic decisions in order to maximize overall profit. Levels of the trait were also an influence on the level of trust an individual had in regards to another person's motives. The authors go on to explain that the use of "cooperative or defecting strategies is subject to important individual differences".

A study done by David Wilson and other researchers noted that while High Machs tend to defect from their groups, they are also unlikely to succeed in the long term simply by manipulating others, and that some cooperation is necessary for further success and to avoid a situation in which they are retaliated against. Wilson also noted that since those who are high in Machiavellianism often come across as charming and attractive in brief social encounters, it is unclear whether they are being deceitful or just very skilled socially. The researchers had people who scored high and low on Machiavellianism write first-person stories. Other participants then evaluated these stories. The results showed that people with low Machiavellianism tended to be more cooperative, while those with high Machiavellianism were more exploitative. Based on these stories, high Machs were generally rejected as social partners, except when their manipulative skills could be used against members of other groups.

== See also ==
- Amorality – Lack or absence of morality
- Dark Factor of Personality – Psychological trait
- Dark Triad Dirty Dozen – Personality test for dark triad

== Sources ==
- Christie, Richard; Geis, Florence L. (1970). Studies in Machiavellianism. doi:10.1016/C2013-0-10497-7. ISBN 978-0-12-174450-2.
- Leary, Mark R.; Hoyle, Rick H., eds. (2013). Handbook of Individual Differences in Social Behavior. Guilford Publications. ISBN 978-1-4625-1489-2.
- Lyons, Minna (2019). The Dark Triad of Personality. Elsevier. doi:10.1016/C2017-0-01262-4. ISBN 978-0-12-814291-2.
- Spielberger, Charles D.; Butcher, James N., eds. (2013). Advances in Personality Assessment. Routledge. doi:10.4324/9781315827483. ISBN 978-1-315-82748-3.
- Fehr, Beverley; Samsom, Deborah; Paulhus, Delroy L. (2013). "The Construct of Machiavellianism: Twenty Years Later". In Spielberger, Charles D.; Butcher, James N. (eds.). Advances in Personality Assessment: Volume 9. Routledge. pp. 77–116. ISBN 978-1-317-84400-6.
- Furnham, Adrian; Richards, Steven C.; Paulhus, Delroy L. (March 2013). "The Dark Triad of Personality: A 10 Year Review". Social and Personality Psychology Compass. 7 (3): 199–216. doi:10.1111/spc3.12018.
