= Jingle-jangle fallacies =

Terminology leading to erroneous conclusions

Jingle-jangle fallacies are erroneous assumptions that either two different things are the same because they bear the same name (jingle fallacy); or two identical or almost identical things are different because they are labeled differently (jangle fallacy). The term was coined by Truman Lee Kelley in his 1927 book Interpretation of educational measurements. In research, a jangle fallacy is the inference that two measures (e.g., tests, scales) with different names measure different constructs. By comparison, a jingle fallacy is the assumption that two measures which are called by the same name capture the same construct.

== Examples ==
An example of the jangle fallacy can be found in tests designed to assess emotional intelligence. Some of these tests merely measure personality or regular IQ. An example of the jingle fallacy is that personality and values are sometimes conflated and treated as the same construct. Jingle and jangle fallacies make it challenging to review literatures for meta-analysis. Machine learning tools have been created to discover relevant papers even when the same construct is named differently in different articles. Some authors have stated that the personality traits Machiavellianism and psychopathy represent the issue of a jangle fallacy, as both constructs are named differently yet describe the same concept. A recent paper published in 2022 stated that Machiavellianism "is theoretically distinct from psychopathy, but empirically they are nearly indistinguishable".

== Views on the phenomenon ==
Herbert Marsh highlighted the issue of jingle-jangle fallacies through a factor analysis of two distinct motivation assessments. His analysis revealed that while the mastery and performance subscales from both instruments aligned with shared underlying factors, the competition subscales, despite being labeled identically, actually represented different psychological constructs: one tied to performance orientation, the other to task orientation. This discrepancy illustrates the importance of conducting thorough construct validity studies to evaluate the true meaning behind measurement instruments. Simply demonstrating that items from a single scale load onto one factor when assessed in isolation does not confirm their distinctiveness when compared with items from other constructs in a broader factor analysis. Moreover, assigning a label to a factor does not justify assumptions about its relationship to other constructs, regardless of how similar or different they might appear. Heyman and Dweck (1992) also warned that researchers must ensure they are not inadvertently measuring the same construct under different names. Pajares (2009) echoed this concern, pointing out how conceptually similar variables may be operationalized differently across studies to serve specific research aims, often leading to confusion, particularly when perceptions of competence are misrepresented as self-efficacy. Likewise, Bong & Skaalvik (2003) recommended the use of confirmatory factor analysis (CFA) and structural equation modeling (SEM) to rigorously test the structural, predictive, convergent, and discriminant validity of motivational constructs, helping to avoid what they termed a "conceptual mess."

== See also ==
- Construct validity
