= Honesty-humility factor of the HEXACO model of personality =

One of the basic HEXACO personality traits

The honesty-humility factor is one of the six basic personality traits of the HEXACO model of personality. Honesty-humility is a basic personality trait representing the tendency to be fair and genuine when dealing with others, in the sense of cooperating with others, even when someone might utilize them without suffering retaliation. People with very high levels of the honesty-humility avoid manipulating for personal gain, feel little desire to break rules, are uninterested in wealth and luxuries, and feel no special right to elevated social status. Individuals with very low levels on this scale will compliment others to get whatever they want, are inclined to break the rules for personal gains, are motivated by material gain, and feel a strong sense of self-importance.

== Subscales ==
Like the other facets of the HEXACO model, Honesty-Humility has four subscales:

- Sincerity – this subscale measures a person's (un)willingness to be manipulative or dishonest in their dealings with other people in order to achieve a desired outcome. High scorers are unwilling to be dishonest or manipulative towards others.
- Fairness – this subscale measures (un)willingness to cheat or steal in order to get ahead, as well as people's tendency to use fraud, be corrupt, or take advantage of others. High scorers have integrity and behave in a manner that treats all parties fairly and equitably.
- Greed Avoidance – this scale measures the value a person places on things like wealth, status, and expensive "toys". Low scorers wish to display their money and luxury, whereas high scorers are less concerned with obtaining wealth and status.
- Modesty – this scale measures a person's beliefs about him/herself in relation to others—high scorers see themselves as "no better" than anyone else, whereas low scorers feel they deserve special treatment and more respect than others.

Each subscale contains items that measure both the trait and the opposite of the trait (e.g. the sincerity scale has items that measure both sincerity and insincerity, with insincerity scores being reverse coded). Each item is measured on a 5-point Likert scale (1 = strongly disagree, 5 = strongly agree). In the 100-item version of the HEXACO questionnaire, each subscale has 4 items, which are averaged together to get individual subset scores, that are then averaged together to get each facet score.

== History ==
Kibeom Lee and Michael C. Ashton began development of the HEXACO model of personality structure in 2000, after cross-cultural research using the same lexical measures that gave us the Big Five began to show a sixth facet of personality. The addition of this sixth factor changed several of the existing factors of the five-factor model. It also integrated several items that did not fit well with the five-factor model and provided further evidence for the idea of reciprocal and kin altruism.

== Relation to the Big Five and five factor models ==
The honesty-humility factor (and the HEXACO model in general) is only moderately correlated with the Big Five model of personality, but is highly correlated with the agreeableness factor of the Revised NEO Personality Inventory (NEO-PI-R), which is one of the factors of the five-factor model of personality. This correlation is mainly due to the Straightforwardness and Modesty subscales of the NEO-PI-R. However, forcing the NEO-PI-R to extract separate factors for honesty and agreeableness allows experimenters to better predict social adroitness and self-monitoring.

Another study found that adding the HEXACO honesty-humility factor to personality measures improves predictive validity for both self- and other-reports of personality, and that simply creating an honesty factor from the FFM measures improves predictive validity for some measures (mainly social adroitness and sexuality measures), but not all (e.g. materialism and delinquency), which indicates that the HEXACO model is a better measure of personality than either the Big Five or the FFM.

== As a predictor for other aspects of personality ==
Honesty-humility has been shown to be positively associated with many desirable traits and negatively associated with many undesirable traits. Honesty-humility is generally associated with pro-social behavior, treating people fairly and being unconcerned with self-promotion.

=== Antisocial behaviors and traits ===
Recent research has shown that the honesty-humility factor is strongly negatively correlated with the "dark triad" of personality (i.e. narcissism, psychopathy, and Machiavellianism). These 3 traits in tandem describe a person who is self-centered, manipulative, and un-empathetic, someone willing to use or hurt others for personal gain. Conversely, a person who is high on honesty-humility is sincere and honest in their dealings with others, concerned with obtaining a fair outcome for all parties involved, unselfish, and modest.

Another study has shown that honesty-humility is significantly negatively correlated with displaced aggression and vengefulness. It is also negatively correlated with immediate or premeditated forms of reaction/revenge against a transgressor. People who are high in Honesty-Humility are unlikely to exhibit displaced aggression or vengefulness or to immediately pick a fight or plan to "get even" with someone who has wronged them. Although forgiveness and tolerance are aspects of agreeableness, a reluctance to engage in anti-social and vengeful behaviors seems to be a hallmark of Honesty-Humility.

=== Political attitudes ===
In a similar vein, honesty-humility has been shown to be negatively correlated with social dominance orientation (SDO). This effect is moderated by interest in politics, such that people who were high in Honesty-Humility and very interested in politics scored at half the levels on the SDO scale as compared to their low interest counterparts. Both groups, though, with high Honesty-Humility scores were below baseline on SDO.

=== Risky behavior and sensation seeking ===
Honesty-humility has also been shown to be negatively correlated with sensation seeking and risk-taking behaviors, as well as thrill and adventure seeking, experience seeking, boredom susceptibility, and disinhibition. This indicates that people high in honesty-humility are likely to be fairly reserved and level-headed individuals who do not take unnecessary risks, act on impulse or engage in dangerous or reckless behavior out of boredom.

=== Workplace behavior ===
Honesty-humility is also strongly negatively correlated with workplace delinquency (e.g. stealing from an employer, vandalism, absenteeism, alcohol use at work). It is also strongly positively correlated with the Employee Integrity Index, which is a measure of attitudes about and admissions to theft. People high in honesty-humility have strict, negative views about theft/thieves, and also report that they have stolen lesser amounts of money than their low–honesty-humility counterparts. Additionally, honesty-humility predicts supervisor ratings of workplace performance, above and beyond ratings of the other five aspects of personality.

=== Creativity ===
Honesty-humility also has a negative relationship with self-reported creativity, though no relationship between creativity and agreeableness was found. Previous research found a strong, negative correlation of the agreeableness factor of the five-factor model of personality with creativity; however, the HEXACO model of agreeableness is a different construct. Additionally, there is a strong correlation between the NEO-PI-R facet of agreeableness and the HEXACO facet of honesty-humility. Honesty-humility is also uncorrelated with objectively assessed intelligence.

=== Sexuality ===
Honesty-humility is also related to the "Sexy Seven" measures of Relationship Exclusivity (e.g. faithfulness vs. adulterous) and restricted sociosexuality (willingness to engage in non-committed sexual acts). These findings indicate that people who score highly on the honesty-humility measures value fidelity in their relationships and require emotional or psychological bonds to engage in sexual relationships. They are unlikely to cheat or exploit a sexual or romantic partner.
