= HEXACO model of personality structure =

Six-dimensional model of human personality

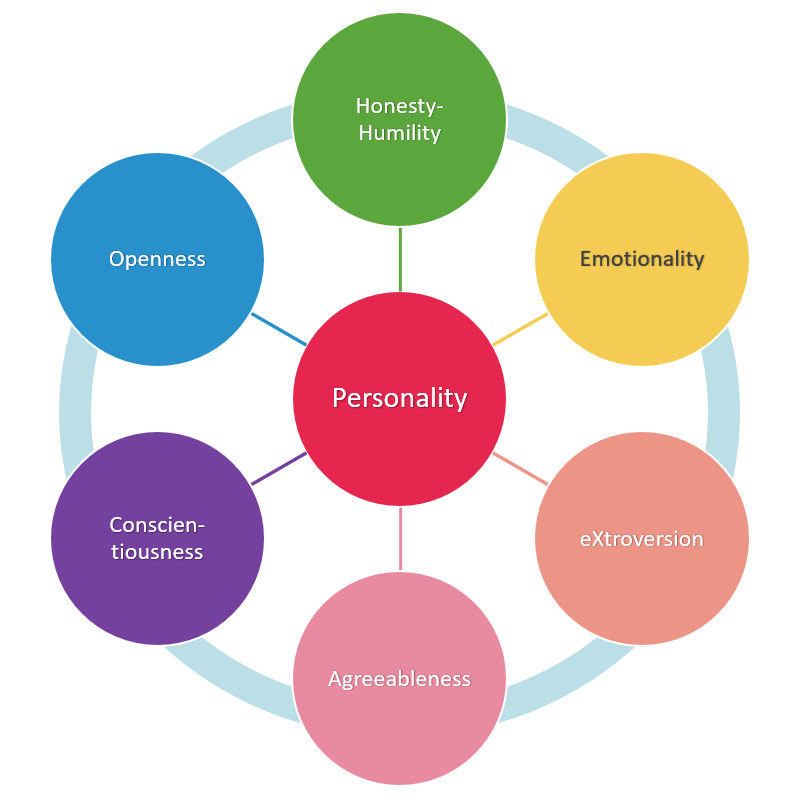
The six HEXACO personality traits

The HEXACO model of personality structure is a six-dimensional model of human personality that was created by Michael C. Ashton and Kibeom Lee, first published in a paper in 2004 and further explained in their 2013 book The H Factor of Personality. Based on findings from a series of lexical studies involving several European and Asian languages, the six factors, or dimensions, include honesty-humility (H), emotionality (E), extraversion (X), agreeableness (A), conscientiousness (C), and openness to experience (O). Each factor is composed of traits with characteristics indicating high and low levels of the factor. The HEXACO model was developed through similar methods as other trait taxonomies and builds on the work of Costa and McCrae and Goldberg. The model, therefore, shares several common elements with other trait models. However, the HEXACO model is unique mainly due to the addition of the honesty-humility dimension.

== Concept ==
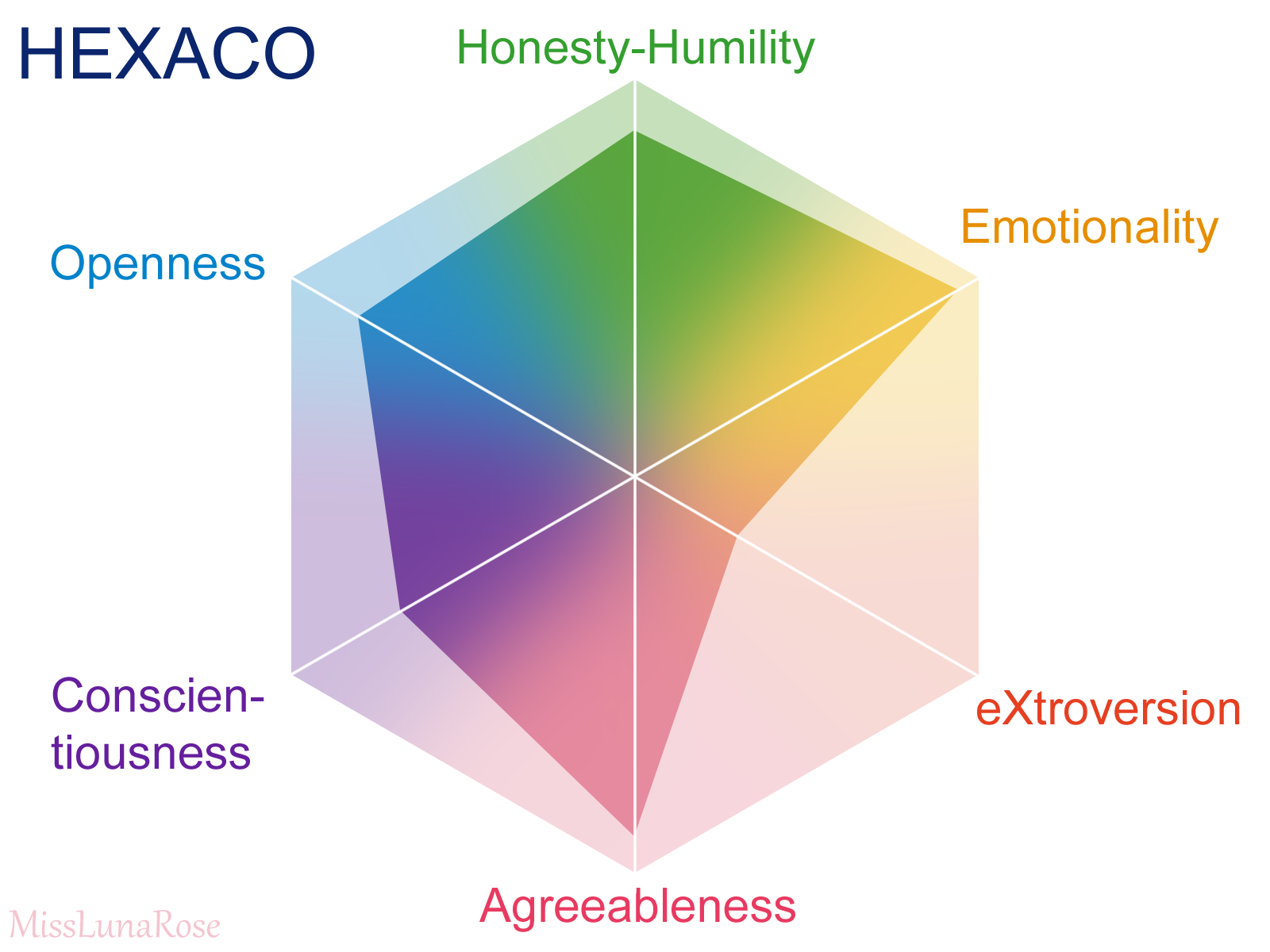
A visualization of a young woman's HEXACO scores

The HEXACO model of personality conceptualizes human personality in terms of six dimensions.

The HEXACO model was developed from several previous independent lexical studies. Language-based taxonomies for personality traits have been widely used as a method for developing personality models. This method, based on the logic of the lexical hypothesis, uses adjectives found in language that describe behaviours and tendencies among individuals. Factor analysis is used on the adjectives to identify a minimal set of independent groups of personality traits.

Research studies based on the lexical hypothesis described above were first undertaken in the English language. Subsequent lexical studies were conducted in other languages and, by comparing the results, six emergent factors were revealed in similar form across all languages tested, including English.

Personality is often assessed using a self-report inventory or observer report inventory. The six factors are measured through a series of questions designed to rate an individual on levels of each factor. Ashton and Lee have developed self- and observer report forms of the HEXACO Personality Inventory-Revised (HEXACO-PI-R). The HEXACO-PI-R assesses the six broad HEXACO personality factors, each of which contains four "facets", or narrower personality characteristics. (An additional 25th narrow facet, called altruism, is also included and represents a blend of the honesty-humility, emotionality, and agreeableness factors.)

The six factors, their facets, and the personality-descriptive adjectives that typically belong to these six groups are as follows:

- Honesty-humility (H):
  - Facets: Sincerity, fairness, greed avoidance, modesty
  - Adjectives: {sincere, honest, faithful, loyal, modest/unassuming} versus {sly, deceitful, greedy, pretentious, hypocritical, boastful, pompous}
- Emotionality (E):
  - Facets: Fearfulness, Anxiety, Dependence, Sentimentality
  - Adjectives: {emotional, oversensitive, sentimental, fearful, anxious, vulnerable} versus {brave, tough, independent, self-assured, stable}
- Extraversion (X):
  - Facets: Social self-esteem, social boldness, sociability, liveliness
  - Adjectives: {outgoing, lively, extraverted, sociable, talkative, cheerful, active} versus {shy, passive, withdrawn, introverted, quiet, reserved}
- Agreeableness (A):
  - Facets: Forgivingness, gentleness, flexibility, patience
  - Adjectives: {patient, tolerant, peaceful, mild, agreeable, lenient, gentle} versus {ill-tempered, quarrelsome, stubborn, choleric}
- Conscientiousness (C):
  - Facets: Organization, diligence, perfectionism, prudence
  - Adjectives: {organized, disciplined, diligent, careful, thorough, precise} versus {sloppy, negligent, reckless, lazy, irresponsible, absent-minded}
- Openness to experience (O):
  - Facets: Aesthetic appreciation, inquisitiveness, creativity, unconventionality
  - Adjectives: {intellectual, creative, unconventional, innovative, ironic} versus {shallow, unimaginative, conventional}

== Scale descriptions ==
- Honesty-Humility: Individuals who score highly on the Honesty-Humility dimension tend to avoid exploiting others for their own benefit, rarely feel inclined to break rules, show minimal interest in opulence or luxury, and do not view themselves as deserving special privileges. In contrast, those with very low scores are more likely to use flattery to manipulate, disregard rules for self-gain, chase after wealth and status, and view themselves as superior to others.
- Emotionality: People who rank high on the Emotionality scale are more prone to fearing physical harm, experience anxiety under pressure, often seek reassurance or support from others, and form deep emotional bonds and empathetic connections. On the other hand, low scorers tend to be unshaken by potential danger, remain calm even during high-stress times, feel little need to confide in others, and show a general detachment from emotional experiences.
- Extraversion: Those who attain high scores in Extraversion typically have a strong sense of self-worth, feel comfortable in leadership roles or public speaking, enjoy being around others, and often feel upbeat and energized. In contrast, individuals with low scores may view themselves as socially undesirable, feel uneasy when in the spotlight, prefer to avoid social events, and generally exhibit less enthusiasm and sociability.
- Agreeableness: Highly agreeable individuals tend to be forgiving when wronged, judge others with understanding, are cooperative and willing to find common ground, and manage their anger well. Conversely, people with low levels of agreeableness often harbor resentment, are more critical of others' behavior, resist compromise, and become easily irritated when treated unfairly.
- Conscientiousness: Those who score high in Conscientiousness keep their environments and schedules well-organized, persist diligently toward their goals, aim for precision in their work, and take time to consider their decisions. In contrast, low scorers tend to neglect order and planning, shy away from difficult tasks, are comfortable with imperfect results, and make choices quickly or without much thought.
- Openness to Experience: Individuals who score high on Openness to Experience are appreciative of artistic expression and natural beauty, are curious to have knowledge of a wide-range of topics, express themselves creatively, and are intrigued by novel or unconventional ideas. Those with lower scores, by comparison, show little appreciation for art or nature, have limited interest in learning new things, avoid imaginative activities, and are less receptive to unusual perspectives or lifestyles.

== History ==
The HEXACO model of personality started initial development in 2000. It was derived from earlier used models of personality such as the Big Five factors covered in the NEO-PI. These Big Five personality traits (conscientiousness, agreeableness, openness to experience, neuroticism, and extraversion) were the result of earlier lexical studies of personality and were popularized in the 1980s. However, when similar lexical studies were conducted in multiple languages rather than only English, a sixth factor emerged, which was called the honesty-humility factor. The other languages included: Dutch, French, Korean, Polish, Croatian, Filipino, Greek, German, Italian, Hungarian, and Turkish. Additionally, the lexical studies in other languages revealed different sub-facets of the emotionality and agreeableness factors than the original five factor model suggested. Today, the HEXACO model has become a widely used model of personality.

Recently, Lee and Ashton have added two more facet scales to the HEXACO-PI Unlike the original 24 facets, each of which was clearly aligned with one of the six main personality dimensions, these new scales were considered "interstitial"—designed to measure traits that show moderate associations with more than one of the six factors.

The first of these interstitial facets was Altruism versus Antagonism, created to capture characteristics related to compassion and kindness. In lexical research on personality traits, such qualities often appear to overlap with the Honesty-Humility, Agreeableness, and Emotionality factors—a pattern that supports our theoretical framework. Adding this facet allowed us to account more precisely for the unique contribution of this trait, improving our ability to predict altruistic (as opposed to antagonistic) behaviors that play a key role in social relationships.

The second interstitial scale, Negative Self-Evaluation, was developed to assess a tendency toward extremely low self-worth. This trait showed a negative correlation with Extraversion and a positive one with Emotionality. It was included not only because self-evaluation is a core component of personality but also due to its relevance in understanding depression and certain personality disorders.

== Relations with Big Five model ==
Currently, the most widely used model of personality structure is also based on analyses of personality-descriptive adjectives. This model consists of the five personality factors collectively known as the "Big Five". Three of the Big Five factors are similar to the extraversion, conscientiousness, and openness to experience factors of the HEXACO model. The two remaining Big Five factors, called agreeableness and neuroticism (with the opposite pole of the latter factor being emotional stability), are similar to the agreeableness and emotionality factors of the HEXACO model – but with some differences in the content of the factors. Agreeableness and emotionality from the HEXACO model represent rotated variants of their Big Five counterparts, for example, characteristics related to a quick temper are associated with neuroticism or low emotional stability in the Big Five framework, but with low agreeableness in the HEXACO framework. Therefore, the Big Five's agreeableness and HEXACO's agreeableness are not identical. The Big Five factors do not include an honesty-humility factor, but some of the characteristics belonging to honesty-humility are incorporated into the Big Five's agreeableness factor. Although earlier investigations found only the Big Five factors, more recent studies conducted in various languages (including English) with larger sets of adjectives recovered six factors, as summarized above. The names of four of the HEXACO factors (all except honesty-humility and emotionality) were adopted from existing labels for the Big Five factors. Factor names were selected on the basis of the common meaning of the characteristics within each factor. Still, other studies that compare the two show that some traits can be analyzed using the HEXACO model instead of the Big Five. For the sake of example, traits like narcissism or manipulativeness can be evaluated with the honesty-humility trait included in the model.

== Research topics ==
=== Theoretical basis of agreeableness, honesty-humility and emotionality ===
The HEXACO model is often used in research studies when behaviors or traits found on the agreeableness, honesty-humility and emotionality dimensions are of specific interest. The factors of agreeableness, honesty-humility and emotionality are distinctly different from their counterparts on the five factor model (FFM). Honesty-humility, emotionality and agreeableness are proposed to be measures of altruistic versus antagonistic behavior. Honesty-humility and agreeableness both measure two different aspects of reciprocal altruism, high levels of which indicate a propensity for helping behavior and cooperation as opposed to the exploitation of others. The honesty-humility factor represents a person's tendency for pro-social altruistic behaviors, while agreeableness indicates an individual's tendency to forgive and to show tolerance. Emotionality is a measure of kin altruism, that is, the tendency to show empathy and attachment to one's kin.

=== Honesty-humility and the dark triad ===
The honesty-humility factor has been used in a variety of studies as a measure of ethical or pro-social behavior (See Ashton and Lee (2008) for further details). Low levels of the honesty-humility factor are associated with greater levels of materialism, unethical business practices and deviant sexual behavior. The honesty-humility factor has been found to predict endorsement of unethical business practices and even the degree to which a person will take health and safety risks (even towards fellow employees). An individual who scores low on the honesty-humility factor may have a proclivity for anti-social acts. Which anti-social acts an individual is likely to commit may be related to their personality profile along the other factors of the HEXACO model. For example, someone who scores low on honesty-humility and low on conscientiousness and agreeableness are more likely to engage in delinquency in the workplace.

The dark triad of personality consists of psychopathy, Machiavellianism and narcissism. Psychopathy is identified by characteristics such as remorselessness, antisociality and selfishness. Machiavellianism consists of selfishness, in that one will focus on their own needs, primarily by manipulating others. Narcissism can also be defined as selfishness, but is different as this person would consider themselves of a higher importance than those around them. However, these constructs are said to be not fully represented in common five-factor models of personality. The dark triad can be conceptualized as being on the opposite pole of honesty-humility (sincere, faithful, loyal etc.), which would mean that low levels of honesty-humility corresponds to higher levels of psychopathy, Machiavellianism and/or narcissism. The dark triad personality constructs tend to only correlate with disagreeableness on the Big Five Inventory, otherwise they are represented inconsistently on measures of the Big Five traits. For that reason, several researchers have used the HEXACO model to gain a more detailed understanding of the personality characteristics of individuals who exhibit traits/behaviors that would be considered along the dark triad dimension.

=== ACT Behavioral Skills Framework ===
The Behavioral Skills Framework (BSF) was developed by the ACT board to focus on building knowledge and skills to be successful in education and work environments. It was structured around, but did not directly replicate, the six HEXACO facets and emphasizes the hierarchical structure of personality.

The HEXACO dimensions visualized in two-dimensions according to the Atlas of Personality, Emotion and Behavior

=== Visualization in two dimensions ===
The dimensions of the HEXACO model of personality has been visualized in two dimensions using the Atlas of Personality, Emotion and Behavior. The adjectives used to describe each HEXACO dimension are scored using the atlas' two orthogonal dimensions of affiliation and dominance. The scored points are then visualized using kernel density plots in two dimensions. The vectors drawn on each of the six plots is a representation of the HEXACO dimension expressed in the two dimensions of the atlas.

== Psychological effects ==
=== Social behavior ===
The addition of the sixth factor, as well as the rotation of agreeableness and emotionality, allows for examination and prediction of behavior based on less prosocial behavior. Studies using the HEXACO model have found support for the relationship between agreeableness and honesty-humility on pro-social and ethical behavior. One study showed a significant relationship between levels of Honesty-Humility and the endorsement of revenge, while another found that levels of Agreeableness were related to the tendency to forgive.

=== Creativity ===
Levels of honesty-humility have also been found to be related to levels of creativity. Specifically, low levels of honesty-humility were found to be related to higher levels of self-reported creativity; though, no relationship between creativity and agreeableness was found.

=== Risk taking ===
Further research using the HEXACO model has examined the relationship between its various domains and scores on risk taking behavior. In one study: levels of emotionality were related to perceptions of risk; levels of conscientiousness were related to perceived benefits; while openness and honesty-humility predicted social risk taking and health/safety risk taking respectively.

=== Sexuality ===
The HEXACO model has also been used in studies of sexuality, including the association of seductive behavior and endorsement of sexual activity without emotional attachment to emotionality and honesty-humility. As well, levels of honesty-humility were associated with being faithful to one's partner in a relationship. Other topics of study that utilized the HEXACO model include: religiosity, prejudice, ethical decision making, academic performance, and political attitudes/behaviors.

=== Education ===
Research shows the H-H and conscientious factors of HEXACO model are useful for predicting counterproductive student behaviors in college students. Conscientiousness may be the most consistent facet of the six in its association to student GPA.

=== Cognitive ability ===
Meta-analytic research shows that openness has a small positive correlation with intelligence and emotionality has a small negative correlation with intelligence. Facets of openness related to inquisitiveness and unconventionality show the strongest correlation with intelligence, in contrast to creativity and aesthetic appreciation. Of the emotionality facets, fearfulness showed the strongest negative correlation with intelligence. Other domains of HEXACO including honesty-humility appear to be uncorrelated with intelligence, although there are several differential correlations at the facet-level. Notably, across conscientiousness facets, a preference for structure and order ("organization") has a small negative correlation with intelligence, whereas prudence had a small positive correlation with intelligence.

=== Employment ===
Strong meaningful associations are shown between the HEXACO model and job satisfaction, most notably the extraversion trait. Research also suggested relationships between the HEXACO, mostly Honesty-Humility trait, and negative work behaviors like sexual harassment, unethical decision making and counterproductive work behavior.

With the exception of the emotionality factor, strong correlations between the other 5 HEXACO factors and organizational citizenship behavior (OCB) have been found. Overall, the HEXACO sub-facets have been shown to be better predictors of OCB than the broader 6 traits, with sub-facets like diligence (conscientiousness), liveliness and sociability (extraversion), and fairness (honesty-humility) being the best predictors.

=== Pro-environment attitudes and behavior ===
Studies show that individual personality differences have a role in shaping environmentalism and HEXACO traits have been shown to predict who is more likely to adopt pro-environment attitudes and behaviors, which are attitudes and actions that are shown to positively affect the environment. The traits of honesty-humility and openness to experience are the strongest predictors of pro-environmental attitudes/behaviors.

=== Subjective well-being ===
HEXACO traits and sub-facets have been shown to predict self-reported psychological and subjective well-being. Extraversion is the largest predictor of well-being closely followed by Conscientiousness. The extraversion sub-facets of liveliness and self-esteem have the highest positive correlations with well-being and the emotionality facet of anxiety has the highest negative correlation with wellbeing. Neuroticism is the best predictor of well-being in the Big Five model, and even though it is closely related to HEXACO emotionality, slight differences between the two traits mean that emotionality is not as good of a predictor of well-being as Big Five neuroticism is.

== Criticisms ==
The HEXACO model of personality is a trait-based taxonomy of personality. As such, the criticism and limitations of the model are similar to that of other trait-based measures (see Big Five personality traits § Critique). Trait-based measures, including the HEXACO model, typically rely on factor analysis. Unfortunately, factor analysis does not always ensure replicable results. Models created through factor analysis can vary between samples, depending on: (i) how the researcher organizes the measures (e.g., using unipolar versus bipolar ratings), and (ii) the amount of ratings/variables that are included in the analysis.

De Raad et al. have argued that only three personality traits have fully replicated (i.e., appeared in all analyses) across cultures (extraversion, agreeableness, and conscientiousness). These authors argue that beyond three traits, the factor markers become unreliable. They further argue that claims of universality for the HEXACO model should be cautiously considered, since many languages and cultures have yet to be assessed with appropriate personality trait studies. Furthermore, the Honesty-Humility dimension is not always consistently replicated. Several past studies have identified inconsistent sixth-factor dimensions (e.g. hedonism–spontaneity) while other research has identified potentially more than six factors. The above criticism is not unique to the HEXACO model, given that there has been considerable debate regarding the identity of the fifth factor of personality in the Five-Factor Model, especially across cultures.

Many studies using the HEXACO model support the usefulness of the dimensions of agreeableness, emotionality and honesty–humility. However, the HEXACO model may not necessarily be a better personality tool in every situation. When the HEXACO model was compared to a modified five-factor model that included a dimension of honesty-humility, the predictive ability of the HEXACO model was similar in several instances to that of the modified FFM (five factor model). The authors further acknowledge that the HEXACO model may have an advantage when the predictor variables are conceptually related to the honesty-humility factor, and that in many cases the modified FFM-plus-honesty-humility model produced similar results.

== See also ==
- Alternative five model of personality
- Big five personality traits
- International Personality Item Pool
- Lexical hypothesis
- Personality psychology
- Revised NEO Personality Inventory
- Trait theory
