= Masochist =

Masochist may refer to:

- Sadomasochism, giving or receiving pleasure from receiving or inflicting pain.

== Music ==
- The Prophet (musician) (born 1968), Dutch DJ and producer who has recorded of the masochist

=== Albums ===
- Masochist (album), by Elysia, or the title song, 2006
- Masochist, an EP by the John Steel Singers, 2009

=== Songs ===
- “Masochist”, by Christina Aguilera from Liberation, 2018
- "Masochist", by Ingrid Michaelson from Girls and Boys, 2006
- "Masochist", by Pendulum from the compilation Jungle Sound: The Bassline Strikes Back!, 2004
- "Masochist", by Tonedeff from Archetype, 2005
- "The Masochist", by Danko Jones from Rock and Roll Is Black and Blue, 2012

== Literature ==
- The Masochist, a 1972 novel by Barry N. Malzberg
- The Masochists, a 2001 graphic novel by Nick Bertozzi

== See also ==
- Masochism (disambiguation)
- Sadism (disambiguation)
- Sadist (disambiguation)
