= Sadist =

Sadist can refer to:

- A person with a high level of everyday sadism, a personality trait characterized by enjoyment of hurting others
- A person with sadistic personality disorder, an obsolete clinical term for people who enjoy the suffering of others

Sadist may also refer to:

== Sexual practices ==
- BDSM, one who engages in the erotic (sexual) practices, interpersonal dynamics, or roleplaying involving bondage, dominance and submission, and masochism
- Sadomasochism, one who engages with consenting partners in aspects of pain or humiliation for sexual pleasure
- Sexual sadism disorder, one who has a medical/psychological condition for sexual arousal from inflicting pain/humiliation on unwilling, non-consenting victims

== Arts and media ==
- Sadist (band), an Italian metal band
  - Sadist (album), their 2007 album
- "Sadist", a song by Stone Sour from House of Gold & Bones – Part 2
- The Sadist (book), a nonfiction book about the serial killer Peter Kürten, by Karl Berg
- The Sadist (1963 film), an American exploitation film
- The Sadist (2025 film), an Indian short film

== See also ==
- Cruelty
- Marquis de Sade, an 18th-century French writer from whom the term sadism derives
- Sadism (disambiguation)
