= Holm Putzke =

German criminal law professor

Professor at the University of Passau, Germany

Personal details
- Born: Dohna, Germany
- Education: Ruhr University Bochum (Germany), German University of Administrative Sciences Speyer (Germany), Jagiellonian University (Poland)

Holm Putzke (1973) is a professor for criminal law at the University of Passau, Germany.

== Education and career ==
Putzke studied law at the Faculty of Law of the University of Bochum and passed the First State Examination in Law 1997, followed by the Second State Examination in Law in 2002. In 2003 he received the PhD in law and 2009 the Master of Laws (LL.M.) at the Jagiellonian University of Kraków/Poland. From 2002 until 2003 he was a graduate teaching assistant at the chair of criminal law, criminal procedure law and general legal philosophy (Professor Dr. Rolf Dietrich Herzberg) at the Faculty of Law, University of Bochum (research in and teaching of criminal law, criminal procedure law and juvenile criminal justice) and from 2003 until 2010 an associate professor at the chair of criminology, criminal policy and police science at the faculty of law, University of Bochum (researcher and lecturer for criminal law, criminal procedure law and juvenile criminal justice). Since 2010 Putzke is a professor (tenured) and works also as a criminal defence lawyer.

He is a member of the advisory boards of the Institute for Secular Law and the Giordano Bruno Foundation. Putzke worked as an expert for the Organization for Security and Co-operation in Europe and the Office for Democratic Institutions and Human Rights (2005), and for the project Juveniles' Rights in Criminal Procedure and Guarantees to their Practical Implementation in Kazakhstan on behalf of the Soros Foundation—Kazakhstan (2005), and on behalf European Union in Bosnia and Herzegovina (2003) and Estonia (2003) as well.

== Main interests ==
Putzke's main fields of interest are criminal law, criminal procedural law, criminal law relating to young offenders and relating to economic offenses, and criminology.

== Legality of male circumcision ==
In 2012, Putzke became known for his work on the legality of male circumcision. On May 7, 2012, a court in Cologne, Germany ruled that circumcision was "inflicting bodily harm on boys too young to consent", deciding that the practice contravenes the "interests of the child to decide later in life on his religious beliefs". This worldwide discussed decision based on the article "Die strafrechtliche Relevanz der Beschneidung von Knaben" ("Criminal Relevance of Circumcising Boys"), published by Holm Putzke in 2008. This article was the first one in Germany which broach the issue; his article had a significant influence for the whole discussion about circumcision as criminal assault in Germany. Putzke's 2008 article set the stage for Germany's legal view of infant circumcision. In the article, he stated, "There are no compelling arguments which can justify a religious circumcision of minors. Without effective consent, the assault is illegal. A physician should refuse to perform a circumcision if it is not medically indicated." In the wake of Germany's controversial ruling, Putzke has been in the media spotlight, receiving threats of drowning and forcible circumcision. Putzke's work swayed significant the current debate in Germany.

Putzke argues "that medically unnecessary operations should be delayed until a patient is capable of deciding whether to have a part of his genitals cut off".

== Bibliography (selection) ==
- Holm Putzke (2014). Die Beschneidungsdebatte aus Sicht eines Protagonisten. Anmerkungen zur Entstehung und Einordnung des Beschneidungsurteils sowie zum Beschneidungsparagrafen (§ 1631d BGB) und zu seinen Konsequenzen. In: Matthias Franz (Hrsg.), Die Beschneidung von Jungen: Ein trauriges Vermächtnis. Vandenhoeck & Ruprecht. ISBN 978-3525404553.
- Reinhard Merkel; Holm Putzke (2013). After Cologne: male circumcision and the law. Parental right, religious liberty or criminal assault?. In: Journal of Medical Ethics (JME), p. 444–449 .
- Holm Putzke; Joerg Scheinfeld (2013). Strafprozessrecht (5 ed.). C.H. Beck. ISBN 978-3406651175.
- Holm Putzke; Joerg Scheinfeld; Gisela Klein; Udo Undeutsch (2009). Polygraphische Untersuchungen im Strafprozess. Neues zur faktischen Validität und normativen Zulässigkeit des vom Beschuldigten eingeführten Sachverständigenbeweises. In: Zeitschrift für die gesamte Strafrechtswissenschaft 121 (2009), p. 607–644 .
- Holm Putzke (2008). Die strafrechtliche Relevanz der Beschneidung von Knaben. Zugleich ein Beitrag über die Grenzen der Einwilligung in Fällen der Personensorge. In: Festschrift für Rolf Dietrich Herzberg, p. 669–709. PDF; 7,12 MB. ISBN 978-3161495700. Translation: Criminal Relevance of Circumcising Boys. A Contribution to the Limitation of Consent in Cases of Care for the Person of the Child. PDF; 142 KB, translated by Katharina McLarren.
- Holm Putzke (2004). Beschleunigtes Verfahren bei Heranwachsenden: Zur strafprozessualen Ausprägung des Erziehungsgedankens in der Adoleszenz. Felix-Verlag. ISBN 978-3927983717.
