= Jean Améry =

Austrian-born essayist

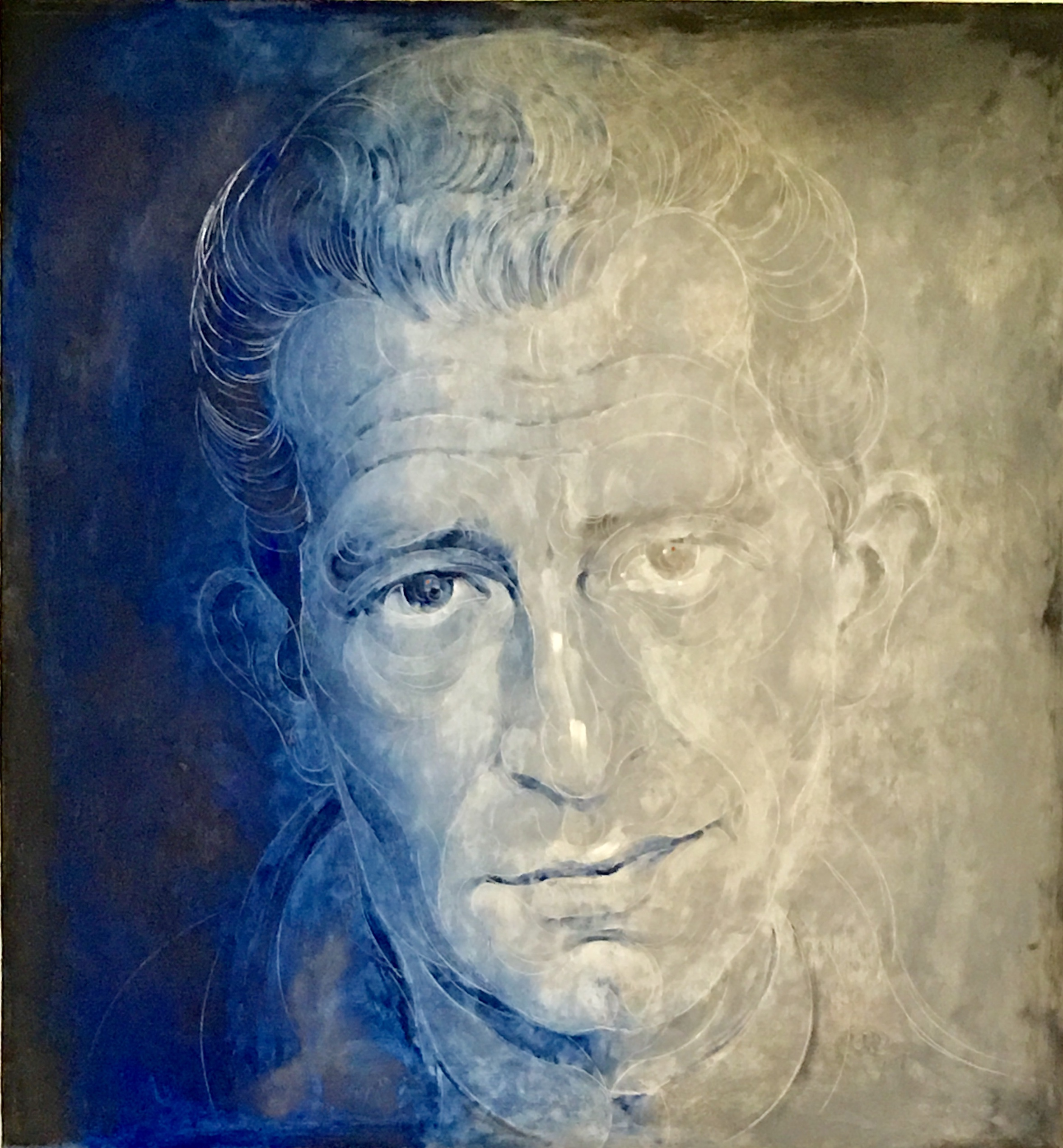
- Portrait of Jean Améry by Félix De Boeck
- Born: Hanns Chaim Mayer; 31 October 1912; Vienna, Austria-Hungary
- Died: 17 October 1978 (aged 65); Salzburg, Austria
- Occupation: Author

Jean Améry (31 October 1912 – 17 October 1978), born Hans Chaim Maier, was an Austrian-born essayist who wrote about his experiences surviving the Holocaust. His most celebrated work, At the Mind's Limits: Contemplations by a Survivor on Auschwitz and Its Realities (1966), suggests that torture was "the essence" of the Third Reich. Other notable works included On Aging (1968) and On Suicide: A Discourse on Voluntary Death (1976). He adopted the pseudonym Jean Améry after 1945. Améry died by suicide in 1978.

Formerly a philosophy and literature student in Vienna, Améry's participation in organized resistance against the Nazi occupation of Belgium resulted in his detainment and torture by the German Gestapo at Fort Breendonk, and several years of imprisonment in concentration camps. Améry survived internments in Auschwitz and Buchenwald, and was finally liberated at Bergen-Belsen in 1945. After the war he settled in Belgium.

== Early life ==
Jean Améry was born as Hans Chaim Maier in Vienna, Austria, in 1912, to a Jewish father and a Catholic mother. Améry himself typically gave his birth name as Hans Mayer; some sources from his early childhood give the name Johann Mayer or Hanns Mayer. His father was killed in action in World War I in 1916. Améry was raised as a Catholic by his mother.

After his father’s death, his mother became the central figure in his upbringing. He attended school first in Vienna, then grew up for a time in Bad Ischl in the Salzkammergut in a predominantly Catholic milieu. In the 1923–24 school year he was admitted as a private student to the gymnasium in Gmunden, which he left in January 1925. In 1926 he and his mother returned to Vienna.

Eventually, Améry and his mother returned to Vienna, where he enrolled in university to study literature and philosophy, but economic necessity kept him from regular pursuit of studies there. He trained as a bookseller and from 1930 to 1938 worked in the bookshop of the Volkshochschule Leopoldstadt. Although largely an autodidact, he also attended lectures at the University of Vienna as an auditor and came into contact with writers including Hermann Broch, Robert Musil, and Elias Canetti. The thought of the Vienna Circle also left a lasting mark on his intellectual development.

== Religion ==
While Améry's family was "estranged from its Jewish origins, assimilated and intermarried", this alienation itself, in the context of Nazi occupation, informed much of his thought: "I wanted by all means to be an anti-Nazi, that most certainly, but of my own accord."

His ambivalent relation to Judaism also had an institutional dimension: he left the Jewish community in 1933 and re-entered it in 1937, apparently in connection with his impending marriage. This tension between assimilation, distance, and inescapable imposed Jewishness would later become central to his reflections on identity.

In 1934 he co-edited the literary journal Die Brücke with Ernst Theodor Mayer. The German article also notes that he was probably involved as a courier of weapons during the failed uprising of the Republikanischer Schutzbund in February 1934.

The Nuremberg Laws of 1935, the text of which he soon came to know by heart, convinced Améry that Germany had essentially passed a sentence of death on all Jews, and that included himself. His The Necessity and Impossibility of Being a Jew speaks to this inner conflict as to his identity. He suggests that while his personal identity, the identity of his own childhood past, is distinctly Christian, he feels himself nonetheless a Jew in another sense, the sense of a Jewishness "without God, without history, without messianic-national hope".

[F]or me, being a Jew means feeling the tragedy of yesterday as an inner oppression. On my left forearm I bear the Auschwitz number; it reads more briefly than the Pentateuch or the Talmud and yet provides more thorough information. It is also more binding than basic formulas of Jewish existence. If to myself and the world, including the religious and nationally minded Jews, who do not regard me as one of their own, I say: I am a Jew, then I mean by that those realities and possibilities that are summed up in the Auschwitz number.

— Jean Améry, At the Mind's Limits, p. 94

== During Nazi rule ==
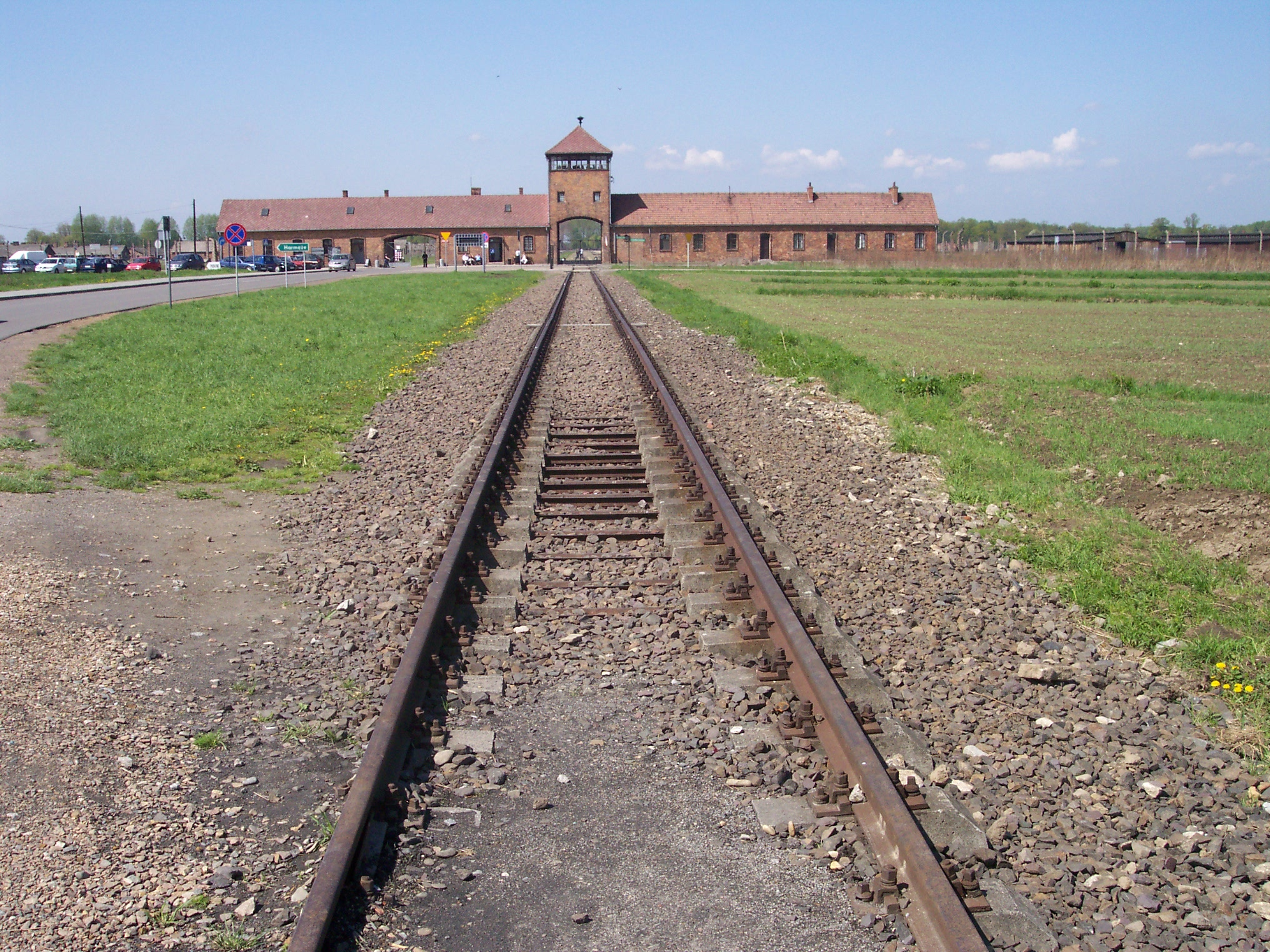
The railway to Auschwitz

In 1938, when the Nazis were welcomed into Austria and the country joined with Germany into a "Greater Reich", Améry fled to France, and then to Belgium with his Jewish wife, Regina, whom he had chosen in opposition to his mother's wishes.

According to the German article, he left Vienna with Regina on 31 December 1938, travelled via Cologne and Kalterherberg, and reached Belgium with the help of a smuggler. Arriving almost penniless, he received support from a Jewish relief committee in Antwerp. To survive in exile, he worked occasionally as a furniture mover and as a teacher at the École Moyenne Juive de Bruxelles.

His wife later died of heart disease while hiding in Brussels.

Améry was initially deported by the Belgian authorities to France as a German national and interned in the south of the country.

After escaping from the camp at Gurs, he returned to Belgium where he joined the Resistance movement.

After his arrest in 1943, he was first imprisoned at Saint-Gilles before being transferred to Fort Breendonk, where he was tortured. The German article specifies that this torture included whipping and suspension by the arms, which dislocated his shoulders.

Involved in the distribution of anti-military propaganda to the German occupying forces, Améry was captured by the Nazis in July 1943 and routinely tortured at the Belgian Gestapo center at Fort Breendonk. When it was established that there was no information to be extracted from him, he was "demoted" from political prisoner to Jew, and shipped to Auschwitz.

Lacking any trade skills, he was initially assigned to harsh physical labor at Auschwitz III-Monowitz, helping to build the I.G. Farben Buna works. In June 1944 he was employed there as a clerk, and it was there that he met Primo Levi. When Auschwitz-Monowitz was evacuated in January 1945, he was deported to Mittelbau-Dora and then to Bergen-Belsen, where he was liberated by British forces in April 1945.

== After the war ==
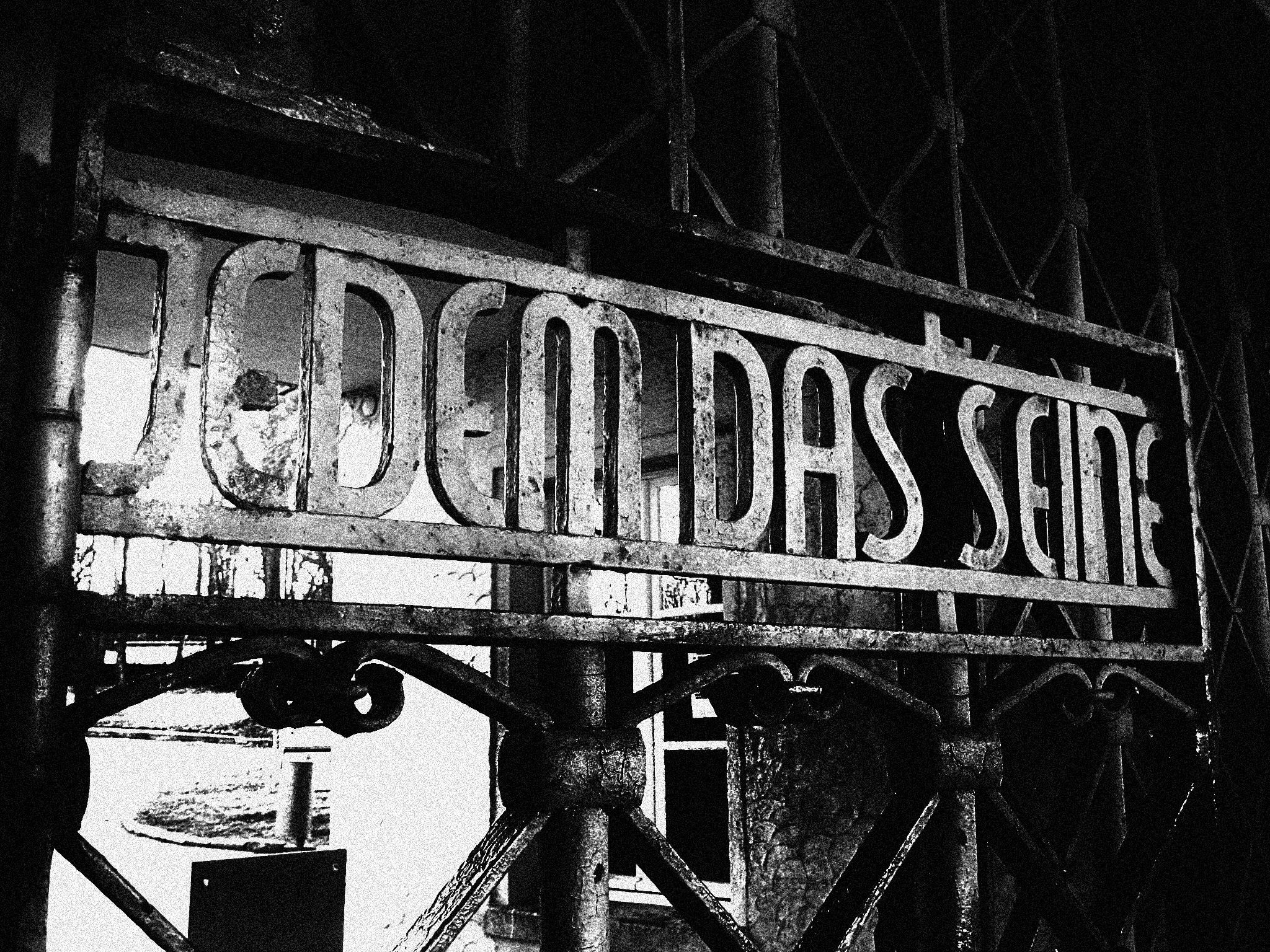
The main gate of Buchenwald Concentration Camp.

The former Hans Mayer began to publish under the pen name Jean Améry in 1955. He chose this pen name, comprising a French-sounding anagram of his family name and a French cognate of his first name, to symbolize his dissociation from German culture and his alliance with French culture. In 1966, he adopted it as his legal name.

Améry lived in Brussels, working as a culture journalist for German language newspapers in Switzerland. Although friends and supporters encouraged him to return to Austria after 1945, he chose not to resettle there. Even after recovering an Austrian passport, he did not take up residence in Austria, though he returned for annual visits. He refused to publish in Germany or Austria for many years, publishing only in Switzerland.

Heinz Kühn had already offered him a post in broadcasting in 1946, though he did not take it. For years he lived only precariously from his writing until mediation by Helmut Heißenbüttel improved his financial situation.

He did not write at all of his experiences in the death camps until 1964, when, at the urging of German poet Helmut Heißenbüttel, he wrote his book Jenseits von Schuld und Sühne ("Beyond Guilt and Atonement"). It was later translated into English by Sidney and Stella P. Rosenfeld as At the Mind's Limits: Contemplations by a Survivor on Auschwitz and its Realities.

He later married Maria Eschenauer-Leitner, who had helped his first wife while she was in hiding during the war. The German article describes her as a decisive supporting presence in his later life and work.

== Death ==
Améry attempted suicide in Brussels in February 1974 and was rescued after being found in a coma by his friend Kurt Schindel. In farewell letters, he reportedly cited declining health and an inability to continue working as a writer.

In 1976 Améry published the book On Suicide: A Discourse on Voluntary Death. In 1978 he died by suicide in the Hotel Österreichischer Hof in Salzburg, by overdosing on sleeping pills. He was buried in an honorary grave at Vienna Central Cemetery.

== Literary and philosophical legacy ==
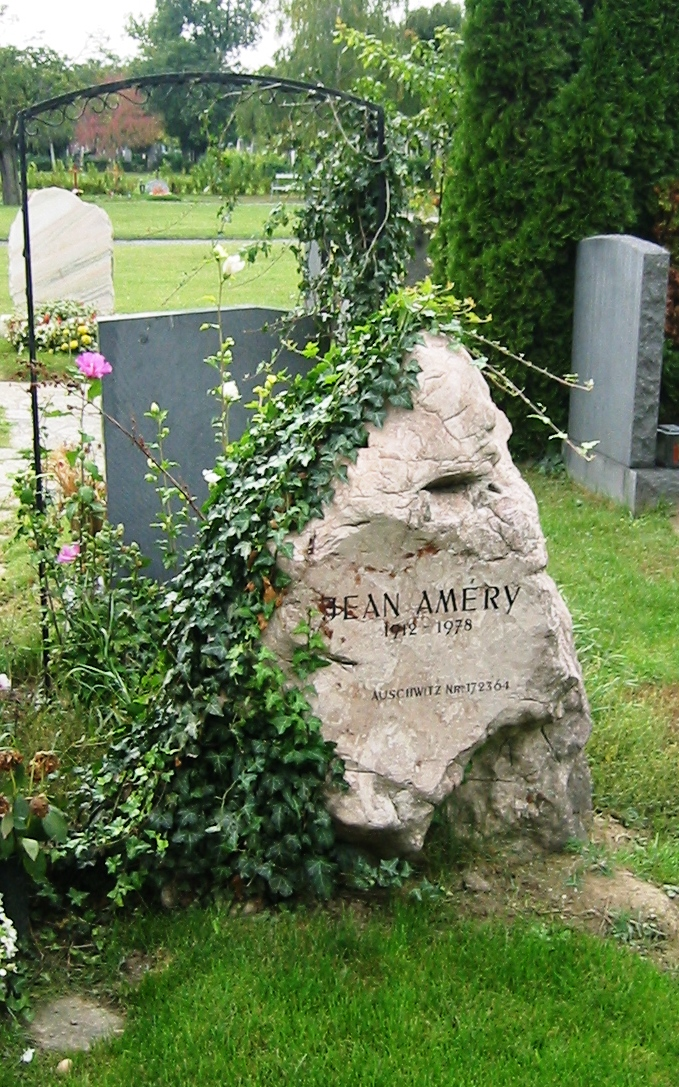
Grave of Jean Améry at the Vienna Central Cemetery

His early literary attempts remained unpublished during his lifetime. Most notably, he was unable to place his youthful novel Die Schiffbrüchigen with a publisher despite encouraging responses from Thomas Mann and Robert Musil; part of it appeared in print in 1935, and the full text was published posthumously.

The publication of At the Mind's Limits, Améry's exploration of the Holocaust and the nature of the Third Reich, made him one of the most highly regarded of Holocaust writers. In comparing the Nazis to a government of sadism, Améry suggests that it is the sadist's nature to want "to nullify the world". For a Nazi torturer,

[a] slight pressure by the tool-wielding hand is enough to turn the other – along with his head, in which are perhaps stored Kant and Hegel, and all nine symphonies, and The World as Will and Representation – into a shrill squealing piglet at slaughter.

In 1967 he sharply criticised Theodor W. Adorno, accusing him of philosophically capitalising on Auschwitz in a language enamoured of its own abstraction. His objection was directed "against the presumption of philosophy to anticipate on a conceptual level what the actual experience of individuals should look like".

Améry's efforts to preserve the memory of the Holocaust focused on the terror and horror of the events in a phenomenological and philosophical way, with what he characterised as "a scant inclination to be conciliatory". His explorations of his experiences and the meaning and legacy of Nazi-era suffering were aimed not at resolving the events finally into "the cold storage of history", but rather keeping the subject alive so that it would not be lost to posterity, as an abstraction or mere text.

As he wrote in his 1976 preface to Beyond Guilt and Atonement:

I do not have [clarity] today, and I hope that I never will. Clarification would amount to disposal, settlement of the case, which can then be placed in the files of history. My book is meant to prevent precisely this. For nothing is resolved, nothing is settled, no remembering has become mere memory.

With the prize money that the Viennese writer Robert Menasse received for the Austrian State Prize (1999) he re-founded the “Jean Améry–Preis für Europäische Essayistik”, whose winners were Lothar Baier, Barbara Sichtermann (1985), Mathias Greffrath (1988), Reinhard Merkel (1991), Franz Schuh (2000), Doron Rabinovici (2002), Michael Jeismann (2004), Journalist, Drago Jančar (2007), Imre Kertész (2009), Dubravka Ugrešić (2012), Adam Zagajewski (2016) and Karl-Markus Gauß (2018).

Other major late works include the “novel-essay” Lefeu oder der Abbruch (1974), in which the protagonist develops an aesthetic of decay and refusal, and Charles Bovary, Landarzt (1978), which reopens the case against Flaubert for his treatment of Charles Bovary as a neglected and distorted figure.

Améry was known for his opposition to antisemitism in postwar Europe and for his engagement with questions of Jewish identity, anti-Zionism, and Israel. These themes, which formed part of his later political and moral writings, have also been collected in English in Essays on Antisemitism, Anti-Zionism, and the Left (2022).

Améry's reflections on torture, resentment, exile and the moral aftermath of the Holocaust have been widely discussed in scholarship on testimony, postwar philosophy and the phenomenology of suffering. Vivaldi Jean-Marie describes At the Mind's Limits as Améry's philosophical testament and reads it as a critique of the inability of traditional philosophy to account adequately for torture, homelessness and the crimes of the Third Reich. Ilit Ferber has compared Améry's account of torture and the destruction of trust in the world with Elaine Scarry's later work on pain, while emphasising differences between their accounts. Améry's position on resentment has also been discussed in relation to Primo Levi, whose The Drowned and the Saved included a chapter on Améry and his refusal of reconciliation.

Améry's later political essays addressed antisemitism, anti-Zionism, Israel and the position of Jewish intellectuals on the political left. Marlene Gallner has described these writings as part of Améry's critique of post war antisemitism and of anti-Zionism on the left. His 1967 essay "Zwischen Vietnam und Israel" addressed the dilemma of left-wing Jewish intellectuals during the Six-Day War and the Vietnam War. A selection of Améry's essays on these themes was published in English as Essays on Antisemitism, Anti-Zionism, and the Left in 2022, edited by Gallner and translated by Lars Fischer.

== Works ==
=== In German ===
- Karrieren und Köpfe: Bildnisse berühmter Zeitgenossen. Zurich: Thomas, 1955.
- Teenager-Stars: Idole unserer Zeit. Vienna: Albert Müller, 1960.
- Im Banne des Jazz: Bildnisse großer Jazz-Musiker. Vienna: Albert Müller, 1961.
- Geburt der Gegenwart: Gestalten und Gestaltungen der westlichen Zivilisation seit Kriegsende. Olten: Walter, 1961.
- Gerhart Hauptmann: Der ewige Deutsche. Stieglitz: Handle, 1963.
- Jenseits von Schuld und Sühne: Bewältigungsversuche eines Überwältigten. Munich: Szczesny, 1966.
- Über das Altern: Revolte und Resignation. Stuttgart: Klett, 1968.
- Unmeisterliche Wanderjahre. Stuttgart: Klett, 1971.
- Lefeu oder der Abbruch. Stuttgart: Klett, 1974.
- Hand an sich Legen. Diskurs über den Freitod. Stuttgart: Klett, 1976.
- Charles Bovary, Landarzt. Stuttgart: Klett, 1978.
- Bücher aus der Jugend unseres Jahrhunderts. Stuttgart: Klett-Cotta, 1981.
- Der integrale Humanismus: Zwischen Philosophie und Literatur. Aufsätze und Kritiken eines Lesers, 1966–1978. Stuttgart: Klett-Cotta, 1985.
- Jean Améry, der Grenzgänger: Gespräch mit Ingo Hermann in der Reihe "Zeugen des Jahrhunderts." Ed. Jürgen Voigt. Göttingen: Lamuv, 1992.
- Cinema: Arbeiten zum Film. Stuttgart: Klett-Cotta, 1994.
- Jean Améry: Werke. 9 vols. Edited by Irène Heidelberger-Leonard. Stuttgart: Klett-Cotta, 2002–2008. The collected works in German.

=== Translations into French ===
- Charles Bovary, médecin de campagne: portrait d'un homme simple. Roman/essai traduit de l'allemand par Françoise Wuilmart. Actes Sud : Arles, 1991.
- Par-delà le crime et le châtiment : essai pour surmonter l'insurmontable. traduit de l'allemand par Francoise Wuilmart. Actes Sud : Arles, 1995.
- Du vieillissement. Payot : Paris, 1991 [1968]; rééd. Petite Bibliothèque Payot 2009
- Le feu ou la démolition. Actes Sud : Arles, 1996 [1974]
- Porter la main sur soi – Du suicide. Actes Sud : Arles, 1999 [1976]
- Les Naufragés. Actes Sud: Arles, 2010 [1935]

=== Translations into English ===
- Preface to the Future: Culture in a Consumer Society. Trans. Palmer Hilty. London: Constable, 1964.
- Essays on Antisemitism, Anti-Zionism, and the Left (Studies in Antisemitism) Indiana University Press; Translation edition (January 4, 2022)
- At the Mind's Limits: Contemplations by a Survivor of Auschwitz and Its Realities. Trans. Sidney and Stella P. Rosenfeld. Bloomington: Indiana University Press, 1980.
- Radical Humanism: Selected Essays. Trans. Sidney and Stella P. Rosenfeld. Bloomington: Indiana University Press, 1984.
- On Aging: Revolt and Resignation. Trans. John D. Barlow. Bloomington: Indiana University Press, 1994.
- On Suicide: A Discourse on Voluntary Death. Trans. John D. Barlow. Bloomington: Indiana University Press, 1999.
- Charles Bovary, Country Doctor: Portrait of a Simple Man. Trans. Adrian Nathan West. New York: New York Review Books, 2018.

== Honors or Awards ==
- 1959: Croix du Prisonnier Politique 1940–1945 (Belgium)
- 1970: Deutscher Kritikerpreis
- 1972: Literature Prize of the Bavarian Academy of Fine Arts
- 1977: Vienna Prize for Journalism
- 1977: Lessing Prize of the Free and Hanseatic City of Hamburg
- 1978: Member of the German Academy for Language and Literature

Jean Améry was an honorary member of the Austrian PEN Club by October 1978.

== See also ==
- List of Austrian writers

== Notes ==
=== Bibliography ===
- Heidelberger-Leonard, Irène (2005). Jean Améry: Revolte in der Resignation (in German) (2nd ed.). Klett-Cotta. ISBN 3-608-93539-8.
