= Joseph Adamy =

Mine owner and politician from the Duchy of Nassau

Joseph Adamy (15 January 1778 in Oberwesel – 24 February 1849 in Hadamar) was a mine owner and politician from the Duchy of Nassau. From 1828 to 1832, Adamy was a member of the Second Chamber of the Estates of the Duchy of Nassau.

== Political career ==
After the death of Jacob Preuss in December 1826, Adamy was elected as a representative of the group of landowners in the electoral district of Dillenburg in the Second Chamber of the Estates of the Duchy of Nassau. Adamy served in the Second Chamber for four years. In 1832, Adamy relinquished his mandate when he was one of the 15 deputies who boycotted the protest against the Pairsschub of 1831 as part of the 1832 Nassau Domain Dispute. The Pairsschub was an instrument used by William, Duke of Nassau to increase membership in the First Chamber of the Estates to benefit his government by weakening the Second Chamber.

In 1849, Adamy was a member of the "Society for the Implementation of the Constitution and Respect for People's Rights" (German: Vereins zur Durchführung der Reichsverfassung und zur Wahrung der Volksrechte).

== Family ==
Joseph Adamy was the son of surgeon (Franz) Joseph Adamy (born 1744/45, died 6 March 1784 in Oberwesel) and his wife Catharina née Herbrand (wedding on 25 November 1772). Joseph Adamy married on 6 September 1801 in Hadamar his first wife, Christina, née Scheibel (11 June 1765 – 12 February 1818). After Christina's death, he married on 24 March 1819 in Mainz, in a second marriage his wife Therese née Leyden (8 August 1877).

== Religion ==
Joseph Adamy was a Roman Catholic.

== Literature ==
- Cornelia Rösner: Nassauische Parliamentarier: Nassauische Parliamentarier. Teil 1. Der Landtag des Herzogtums Nassau 1818 – 1866, Wiesbaden 1997, ISBN 3-930221-00-4, Seite 3
