= Ninon Colneric =

German judge

Judge of the European Court of Justice
- In office 2000–2006

Personal details
- Born: 29 August 1948 (age 78) Oer-Erkenschwick, Germany
- Education: LMU Munich
- Occupation: Judge, legal scholar
- Known for: First female German judge at the ECJ

Ninon Colneric (b. 29 August 1948, Oer-Erkenschwick) is the first female German judge at the European Court of Justice (2000-2006). Before joining the ECJ, she served as President of the Landesarbeitsgericht Schleswig-Holstein and worked extensively on European and international labour-law reform projects.

== Education ==
Colneric graduated from the Municipal Modern Language Girls' Grammar School in Datteln in 1967. In 1967/1968, she studied German language and literature and philosophy at the University of Tübingen with the aim of becoming a teacher.

In 1972, she passed her first state law examination at LMU Munich with a grade of "good".

In 1973 and 1974, she conducted research for her dissertation in Great Britain and was a visiting scholar at the London School of Economics.

From March 1974, she completed her legal clerkship in Bavaria and was a research assistant at the Institute for European and International Economic Law at LMU Munich in 1974/1975. In 1976, she passed her second state law examination in Munich, receiving a grade of "fully satisfactory".

She studied legal science in Tübingen, Munich and Geneva. In 1977, she received her doctorate with summa cum laude honours. In 1978, she was awarded the Faculty Prize by LMU Munich for her dissertation. As a student and doctoral candidate, Colneric received funding from the German Academic Scholarship Foundation.

She was authorised, by the University of Bremen, to teach labour law, sociology of law and social law.

== Career ==
She was professor ad interim at the faculty of law of the universities of Frankfurt, and Bremen. She was a judge at the Labour Court (Arbeitsgericht) Oldenburg (1986-1989). She was president of the Landesarbeitsgericht Schleswig-Holstein (1989-2000). She collaborated, as an expert, on the European Expertise Service (European Union) project for the reform of the labour law of Kirghizstan (1994 to 1995). She was an honorary Professor at the University of Bremen in labour law, specifically in European labour law.

From 2000 until 2006 she was the first female German judge at the European Court of Justice. From 2008 until 2011 she became Co-Dean at the China-EU School of Law, a cooperative project between a consortium of European universities and the China University of Political Science and Law.

Since 2018 she is member of the Whistleblower-Netzwerk e.V., and since 2020 a member of the advisory board of the Institute for Secular Law.

== See also ==
- List of members of the European Court of Justice
