= Sadism =

Sadism may refer to:

- Everyday sadism, the derivation of gratification from the physical pain or humiliation of another person
- Sadomasochism, the giving or receiving of pleasure from acts involving the receipt or infliction of pain or humiliation
- Sadistic personality disorder, an obsolete clinical term proposed for individuals who derive pleasure from the suffering of others
- Sexual sadism disorder, a medical/psychological condition for sexual arousal from inflicting pain/humiliation on unwilling, non-consenting victims

== See also ==
- BDSM, sadomasochistic play between consenting adults
- Cruelty, the intentional infliction of suffering or the inaction towards another's suffering
- Sadist (disambiguation)
- Marquis de Sade (1740–1814), French writer for whom sadism was named
