= Wiebelsheim =

- Municipality
- Coat of arms

- Location of Wiebelsheim within Rhein-Hunsrück-Kreis district
- Interactive map of Wiebelsheim
- Location within Germany Location within Rhineland-Palatinate
- Coordinates: 50°4′36″N 7°38′6″E
- Country: Germany
- State: Rhineland-Palatinate
- District: Rhein-Hunsrück-Kreis
- Municipal assoc.: Hunsrück-Mittelrhein

Government
  - Mayor (2019–24): Michael Brennemann

Area
  - Total: 7.32 km^{2} (2.83 sq mi)
- Elevation: 440 m (1,440 ft)

Population (2025-12-31)
  - Total: 607
  - Density: 82.9/km^{2} (215/sq mi)
- Time zone: UTC+01:00 (CET)
  - Summer (DST): UTC+02:00 (CEST)
- Postal codes: 56291
- Dialling codes: 06766
- Vehicle registration: SIM
- Website: www.wiebelsheim.de

Wiebelsheim is an Ortsgemeinde – a municipality belonging to a Verbandsgemeinde, a kind of collective municipality – in the Rhein-Hunsrück-Kreis (district) in Rhineland-Palatinate, Germany. It belongs to the Verbandsgemeinde Hunsrück-Mittelrhein, whose seat is in Emmelshausen.

== Geography ==
=== Location ===
The municipality lies on the eastern edge of the Hunsrück, roughly 7 km from the Rhine at Oberwesel and 8 km north-northwest of Rheinböllen, at an elevation of some 440 m above sea level. It is bordered in the east by the Rhine Gorge, a UNESCO World Heritage Site and the part of the Rhine valley that features the Loreley, although that is over on the other side. Here the gorge separates the Hunsrück from the plateau on the other side, the Taunus. Wiebelsheim has 631 inhabitants and an area of 7.32 km^{2}.

== History ==
Wiebelsheim might have first arisen sometime between 800 and 1000 as one of the settlements in the Hunsrück's heights, as other places with the placename ending —heim are known to have been founded by the Franks in that time.

The village's history is tightly woven together with Oberwesel's. About 1400, Wiebelsheim was assigned to the altar benefice created in 1392 in Damscheid, albeit within the framework of Oberwesel's two greater parishes, Our Lady's and Saint Martin's (Liebfrauen and St. Martin), to the latter of which Wiebelsheim belonged. As late as 1786, parishioners’ children from Wiebelsheim were required to take part in “Saint Mark’s Procession” in Oberwesel, and at the same time they were still contributing to the building of a new rectory for Saint Martin's.

In the 15th century, Wiebelsheim had its own court of Schöffen (roughly “lay jurists”), whose high court was the Oberwesel Town Court.

Beginning in 1794, Wiebelsheim lay under French rule. The cantonal administration introduced in 1798 by the French did not last long, and in 1800, mairies (“mayoralties”) were set up within the cantons. Originally, it had been foreseen that Oberwesel and Wiebelsheim would be merged into one mairie, but the villages of Damscheid, Liebshausen, Perscheid, Wiebelsheim, Dellhofen and Langscheid (these last two now being outlying centres of Oberwesel), which had all belonged to the Amt of Oberwesel before the French Revolution mounted a concerted opposition to the merger with their old Amt seat, which arose at least in part from old animosities, such as a trial held in 1787.

As a result of the Congress of Vienna, the lands between the Moselle and the Nahe passed to Prussia in 1815. In the course of the administrative reform that followed, the district of St. Goar came into being in 1816, which comprised, among other places, the Bürgermeisterei (“Mayoralty”) of Wiebelsheim, although Liebshausen was split off this and grouped into the district of Simmern. In 1828, Wiebelsheim's then mayor, named Hörter, became the first elected district deputy in the new district of St. Goar. In 1884, the Bürgermeistereien of Oberwesel and Wiebelsheim, which had been split apart in 1851, were reunited. The name of the Amt of Wiebelsheim was changed by the Self-Administration Law of 5 October 1954 to Oberwesel, so that henceforth there were the town and Amt of Oberwesel, which were governed by the same body. The 1968 administrative reform changed the Ämter into Verbandsgemeinden.

On 11 April 1826, Wiebelsheim burned down. Only nine houses were spared. The historical fire engine from this time, which was worked with muscle power by strong men, can still be found today at the Wiebelsheim volunteer fire brigade’s equipment building.

In 1846, the church that still stands today, which is consecrated to Saint Peter, was built. One of its peculiarities is that it is one of the few churches in the area that have two towers. On 16 August 1982, the church was placed under protection as a cultural monument.

From 1940 to 1941, during the Second World War, Wiebelsheim was the location of Stalag XII C. Since 1946, Wiebelsheim has been part of the then newly founded state of Rhineland-Palatinate.

The village, which was once characterized mainly by agriculture, has changed its outlook considerably over the last few decades. Agricultural businesses, both fulltime operations and those worked as sidelines, have been disappearing, and farm buildings have been either converted or torn down. New building zones have been opened. Even the building of the Autobahn A 61 helped see to it that farmers became employees, commuting to jobs in Rheinböllen, Simmern, Koblenz or the Frankfurt Rhine Main Region.

Spurred on by the excellent location right on the A 61, work began in the late 1980s on the opening up of the Wiebelsheim Industrial Park. Many commercial operations found that this was just the kind of location that they sought. The new jobs that arose from this and the new house building that also took place brought about a 25% rise in population over only a few years, to 500 as of 2006. The village’s character, however, was preserved through renovation work on the village centre, a reconstruction of the historical village fountain and a new building, the community centre St. Aldegundis.

This community centre serves the local club Kirchenchor Cäcilia (church choir), the Wiebelsheim volunteer fire brigade, the table tennis club, the women’s association, the seniors’ group, the youth group and all inhabitants, young and old.

For sporting activities, the earth dump on Perscheider Straße used during the building of the industrial park in the early 1990s was laid out as a new sporting ground. Onto the meadows owned by the municipality, three plateaux were built with the fill. On the highest one, a grass field was laid, mostly by volunteer labour. The field is used by leisure footballers (men's and women's teams) from TTC Wiebelsheim (a sport club) and school and youth teams from the Laudert-Wiebelsheim sport club.

== Politics ==
=== Municipal council ===
The council is made up of 12 council members, who were elected by majority vote at the municipal election held on 7 June 2009, and the honorary mayor as chairman.

=== Mayor ===
Wiebelsheim's mayor is Michael Brennemann.

=== Coat of arms ===
The German blazon reads: Das Wappen zeigt in Grün über golden geteiltem Schilde oben eine silberne Taube, unten zwei gekreuzte rote Schlüssel.

The municipality's arms might in English heraldic language be described thus: Per fess vert a dove argent and Or two keys per saltire, the wards to chief and turned out gules.

The dove is one of Saint Aldegonde's attributes, thus representing the municipality's patron saint. Saint Aldegonde's Chapel in the forest is long gone, but lives on among the inhabitants, and Saint Aldegonde herself is remembered each year in a market, the Aldegundismarkt, which has been held for centuries. The keys are Saint Peter’s attribute, thus representing Saint Peter's Church (Petruskirche).

== Culture and sightseeing ==
=== Buildings ===
The following are listed buildings or sites in Rhineland-Palatinate’s Directory of Cultural Monuments:

- Saint Peter's and Saint Paul's Catholic Church (Kirche St. Peter und Paul), Simmerner Straße 3 – quarrystone aisleless church, 1846/1847
- Simmerner Straße 9 – timber-frame Quereinhaus (a combination residential and commercial house divided for these two purposes down the middle, perpendicularly to the street), partly solid or slated, mid 19th century

== Economy and infrastructure ==
=== Established businesses ===
In Wiebelsheim are found the head offices of two publishing houses, Quelle & Meyer and Aula.
