= Masochism (disambiguation) =

Masochism is the enjoyment of receiving pain or humiliation.

Masochism may also refer to:

- Sexual masochism disorder, a medical condition in which pain or humiliation is required for sexual arousal and causes distress or impairment
- "Masochism", a song by Sega Bodega from Salvador
- Masochism: Coldness and Cruelty, a 1967 book by Gilles Deleuze
- Masochism: Current Psychoanalytic Perspectives, a 1993 book by Robert Glick and Donald Meyers

== See also ==
- Masochist (disambiguation)
