= Oberwesel =

- Town
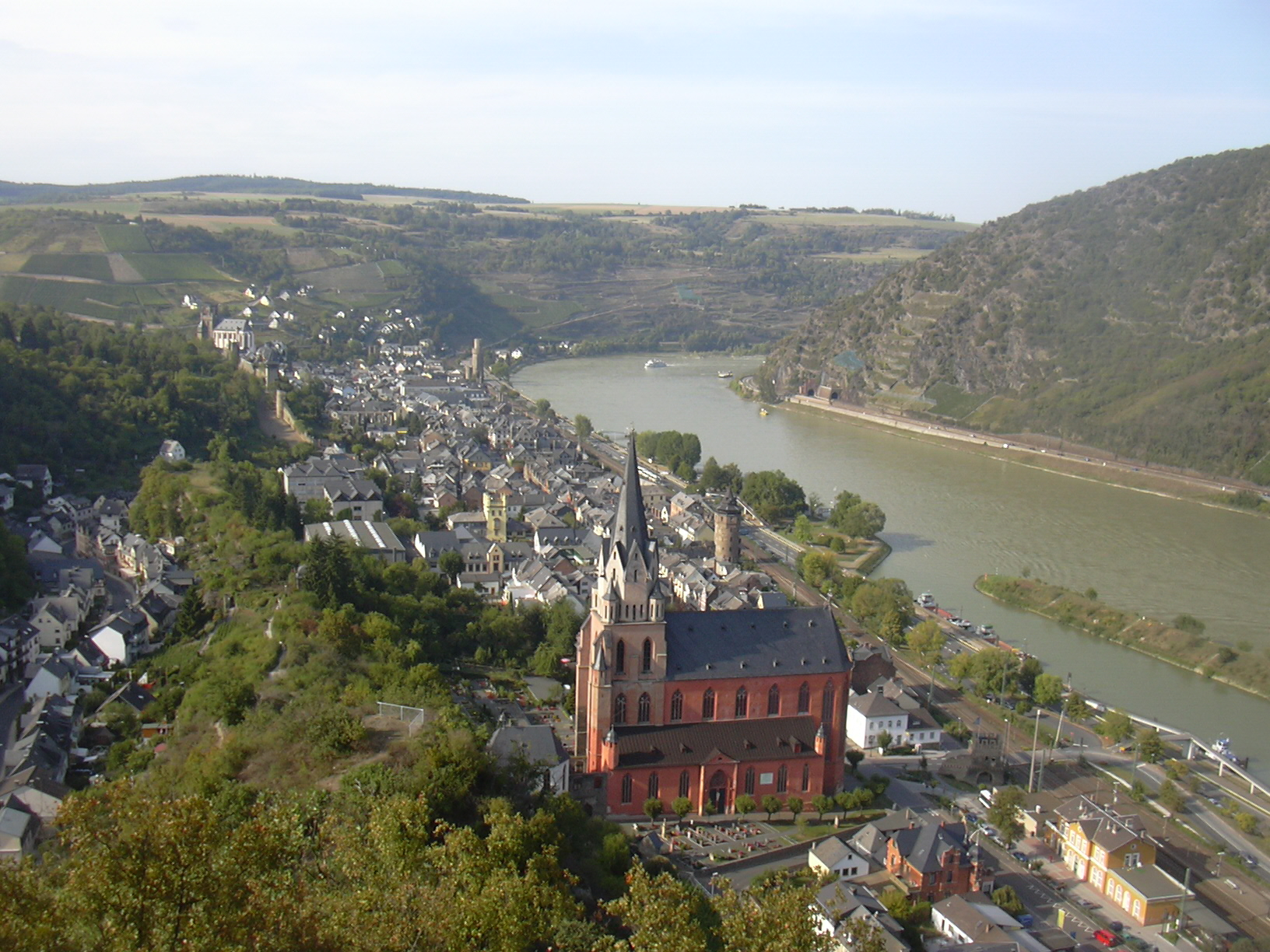

- Coat of arms

- Location of Oberwesel within Rhein-Hunsrück-Kreis district
- Interactive map of Oberwesel
- Location within Germany Location within Rhineland-Palatinate
- Coordinates: 50°06′27″N 7°43′35″E
- Country: Germany
- State: Rhineland-Palatinate
- District: Rhein-Hunsrück-Kreis
- Municipal assoc.: Hunsrück-Mittelrhein
- Subdivisions: 4

Government
  - Mayor (2019–24): Marius Stiehl (CDU)

Area
  - Total: 18.08 km^{2} (6.98 sq mi)
- Elevation: 75 m (246 ft)

Population (2025-12-31)
  - Total: 2,878
  - Density: 159.2/km^{2} (412.3/sq mi)
- Time zone: UTC+01:00 (CET)
  - Summer (DST): UTC+02:00 (CEST)
- Postal codes: 55430
- Dialling codes: 06744
- Vehicle registration: SIM
- Website: oberwesel.de

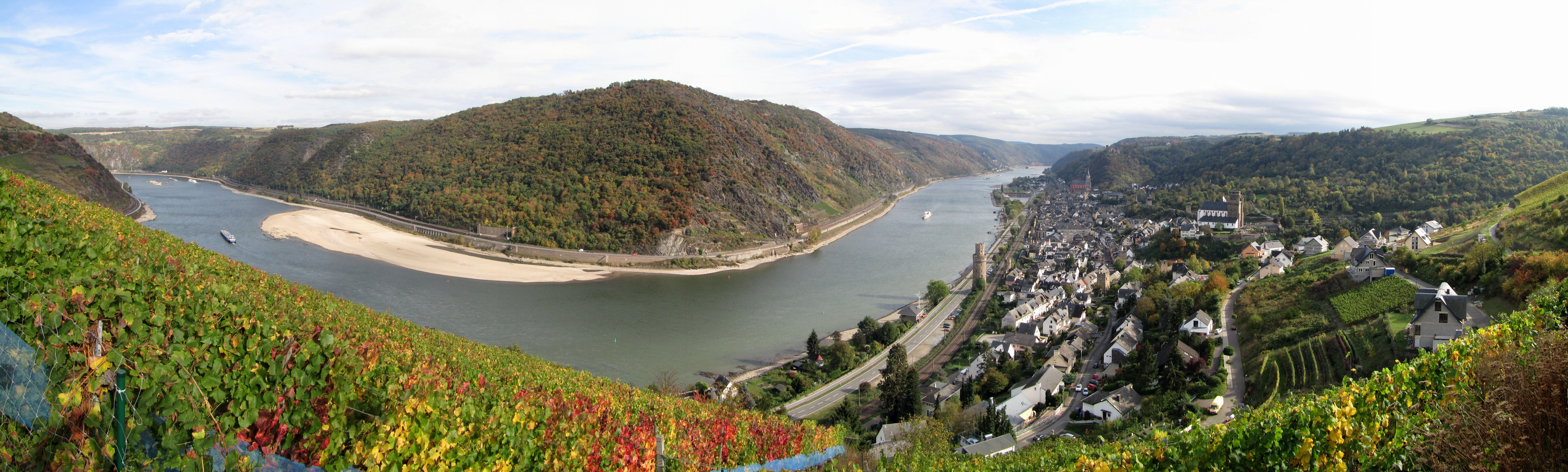
The Rhine Gorge at Oberwesel

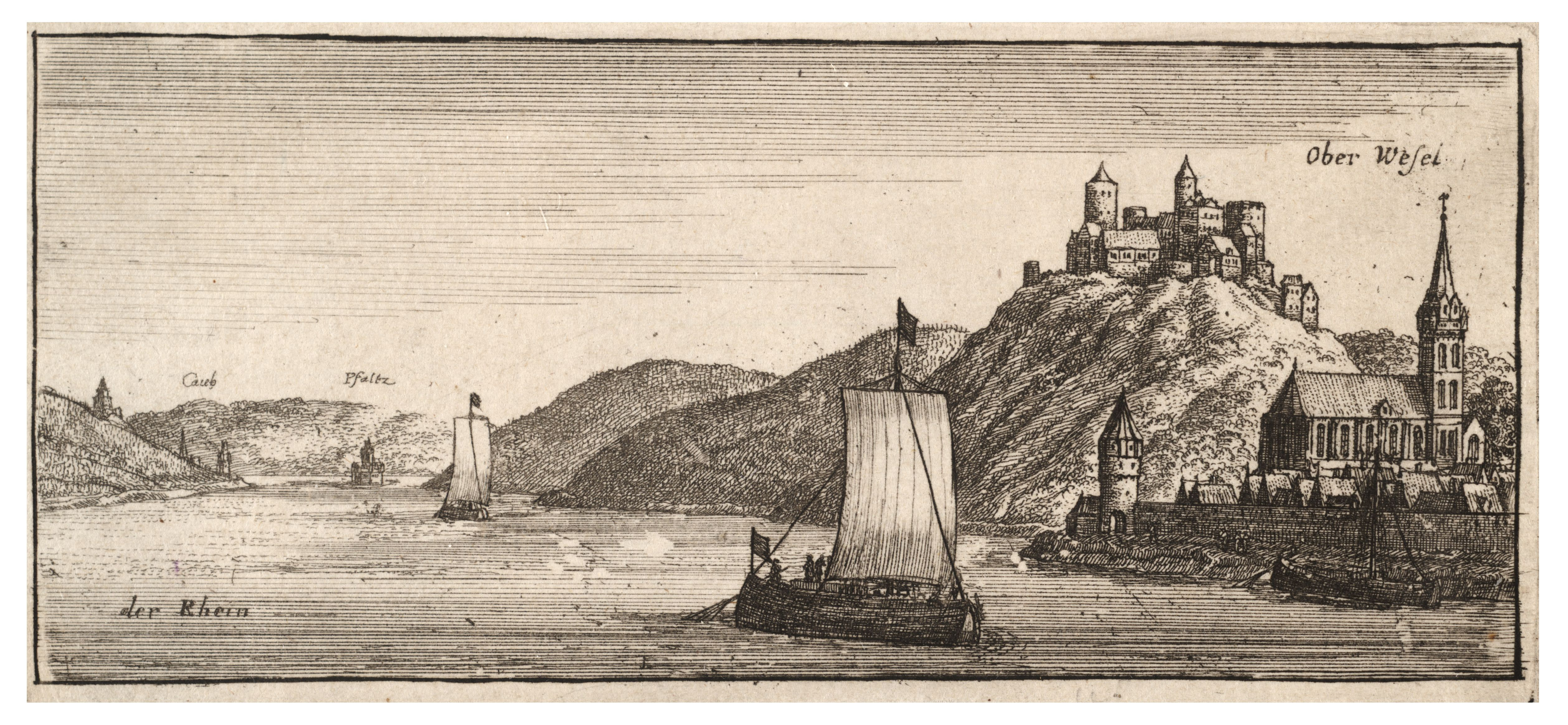
a 17th-century engraving of Oberwesel by Wenceslas Hollar

Oberwesel (German pronunciation: [oːbɐˈveːzl̩]) is a town on the Middle Rhine in the Rhein-Hunsrück-Kreis (district) in Rhineland-Palatinate, Germany. It belongs to the Verbandsgemeinde Hunsrück-Mittelrhein, whose seat is in Emmelshausen.

== Geography ==
=== Location ===
Oberwesel lies on the river Rhine’s left (west) bank in the Rhine Gorge or Upper Middle Rhine, a UNESCO World Heritage Site, between the neighbouring towns of Sankt Goar and Bacharach. It is called Oberwesel ("Upper Wesel") to distinguish it from the other city called Wesel along the Lower Rhine.

=== Constituent communities ===
The town is made up of several Stadtteile, namely the main centre, also called Oberwesel, and the outlying centres of Engehöll, Dellhofen and Langscheid.

=== Climate ===
Yearly precipitation in Oberwesel amounts to 604 mm, which is very low, falling into the lowest fourth of the precipitation chart for all Germany. Only at 22% of the German Weather Service’s weather stations are even lower figures recorded. The driest month is February. The most rainfall comes in June. In that month, precipitation is 1.6 times what it is in February. Precipitation varies only slightly. At only 1% of the weather stations are lower seasonal swings recorded.

== History ==
As in many of the region’s towns, Oberwesel quite possibly had its beginnings as a Celtic settlement, named Vosavia or Volsolvia. The Romans later maintained a horse-changing station with a hostel here. After the fall of the limes, Oberwesel became a Frankish royal holding with a royal estate. The Wesel Estate passed under Emperor Otto I in 966 to the Archbishopric of Magdeburg. In 1220, Emperor Frederick II dissolved the pledge and Oberwesel became a free imperial city. In 1255, Oberwesel became a member of the Rhenish League of Towns (Rheinischer Städtebund), but in 1309, it lost its status as a free imperial city and fell under the lordship of the Electorate of Trier, to which it belonged until Secularization after the French Revolutionary Wars in 1802. In the so-called Weseler Krieg (“Wesel War”) in 1390 and 1391, the town tried yet again to turn over a new leaf, but after a successful siege by Archbishop of Trier Werner von Falkenstein, it had to back down.

Winegrowing, fishing, trade and handicrafts helped the town gather enough wealth to begin work on the town walls in 1220, building them in three phases from then until the mid 14th century. The town's importance in the Middle Ages can be gathered from the two great ecclesiastical foundations that it harboured (Our Lady's – or Liebfrauen in German – and Saint Martin's), as well as the two monasteries and the Beginenhof. All together, nine monasteries had sizeable commercial holdings in town.

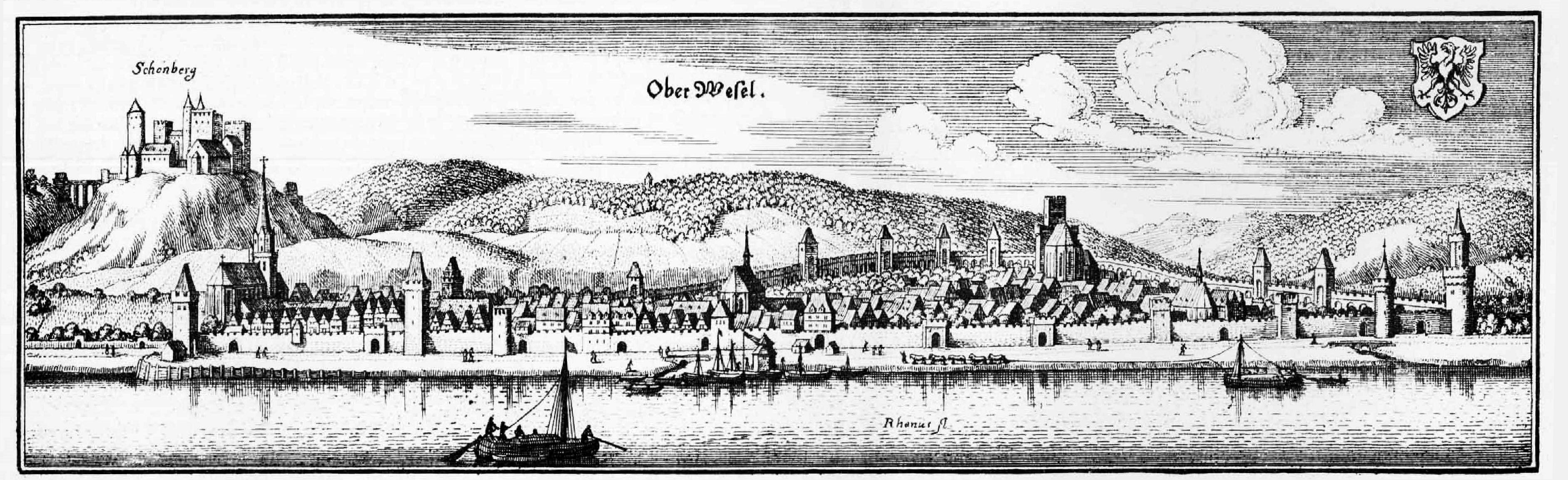
Historical portrait of the town with complete town wall (copper engraving by Matthäus Merian, 17th century)

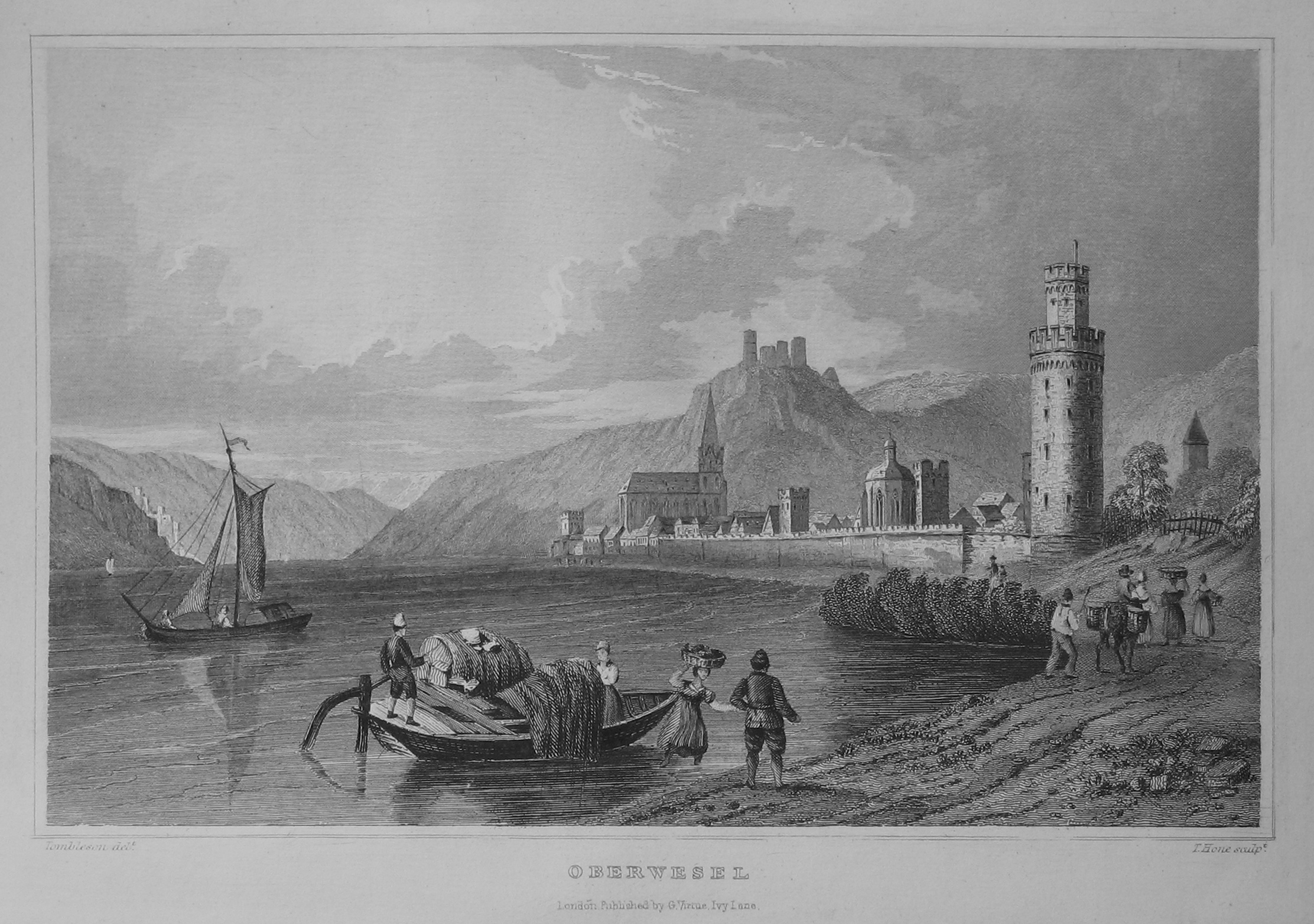
View of the town from 1832, steel engraving after Tombleson

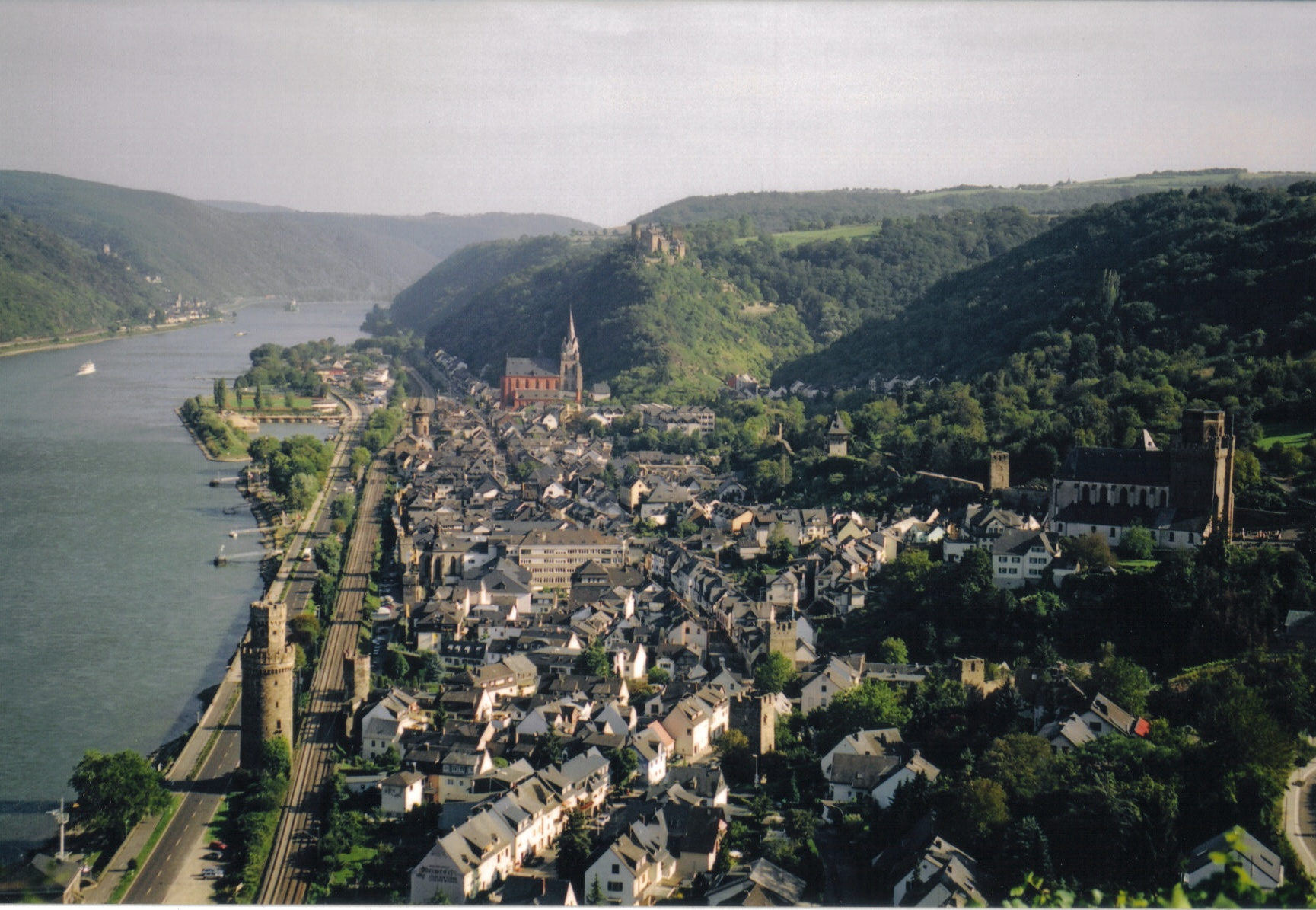
View of Oberwesel

In 1689, in the Nine Years' War (known in Germany as the Pfälzischer Erbfolgekrieg, or War of the Palatine Succession), Oberwesel was destroyed for the first time, by soldiers of the First French Empire. In 1794, the town was occupied by French Revolutionary troops and in 1802 was annexed by France. After the Congress of Vienna, Oberwesel became, along with the rest of the Rhine's left bank, Prussian.

=== "Saint" Werner ===
"Saint Werner's Chapel" on the side of the town wall facing the Rhine was renovated in 2001. It was consecrated to the former saint, Werner of Oberwesel. In iconography, Werner was shown with a winegrower's billhook, a shovel and a pan as attributes, and was said to be the patron saint of winemakers. According to a blood libel, 16-year-old Werner was said to have been murdered on Maundy Thursday 1287 in Oberwesel by local Jews who were thought to have wanted to use his blood in their Passover rituals. A 14th-century Latin chronicle reports of an alleged host desecration: Jews from local communities hung Werner up by the feet to rob him of a piece of sacramental bread that he was about to swallow. The Jews then threw him in the Rhine. At the spot on the riverbank in Bacharach where his body washed up, the Gothic, Rheinromantik Saint Werner's Chapel was built. When word of the ritual murder spread, outraged mobs rose up, destroying not only Jewish communities on the Middle Rhine, but also up the Moselle and down on the Lower Rhine, too. In folk Christianity, the Cult of Werner arose, and it was only stricken from the calendar of the Diocese of Trier in 1963. Heinrich Heine treated the legend in his fragmentary tale, Der Rabbi von Bacherach.

=== Amalgamations ===
From 7 November 1970, the town formed with the municipalities of Damscheid, Dellhofen, Langscheid, Laudert, Niederburg, Perscheid, Urbar and Wiebelsheim the Verbandsgemeinde of Oberwesel. In the course of administrative restructuring in Rhineland-Palatinate, the new Verbandsgemeinde of Sankt Goar-Oberwesel was formed out of the towns of Sankt Goar and Oberwesel on 22 April 1972, with the administrative seat at Oberwesel. On 17 March 1974, the formerly self-administering municipalities of Langscheid, Dellhofen and Urbar were amalgamated with Oberwesel, although on 13 June 1999, Urbar once again became self-administering.

== Politics ==
=== Town council ===
The council is made up of 20 council members, who were elected by proportional representation at the municipal election held on 7 June 2009, and the honorary mayor as chairman.

The municipal election held on 7 June 2009 yielded the following results:

	SPD	CDU	FWO	other	Total
2009	4	12	4	-	20 seats
2004	3	14	-	3	20 seats

Elections in 2014:

Wahl	SPD	CDU	FWO	Total
2014	4	12	4	20 seats

=== Mayor ===
Oberwesel's mayor is Marius Stiehl.

Oberwesel's mayors since the Second World War have been:

- 1945-1946: Schaus, SPD
- 1946-1948: Heinrich Hermann, CDU
- 1948–1976: August Zeuner, CDU
- 1976–1979: Hans Stemick, CDU
- 1980–1989: Johann Peter Josten, CDU
- 1989–1994: Willy Wißkirchen, FWO (Freie Wählergruppe Oberwesel)
- 1994–2009: Manfred Zeuner, CDU
- 2009–2019: Jürgen Port, CDU
- 2019–: Marius Stiehl, CDU

=== Coat of arms ===
The German blazon reads: In Gold ein rot bewehrter und rot bezungter schwarzer Adler.

The town's arms might in English heraldic language be described thus: Or an eagle displayed sable armed and langued gules.

From 1237 to 1309, the town was a free imperial city. Ever since, it has borne the Imperial Eagle as a charge in the town seal and the civic coat of arms.

The town's colours are black and yellow.

== Culture and sightseeing ==
=== Buildings ===
The following are listed buildings or sites in Rhineland-Palatinate’s Directory of Cultural Monuments:

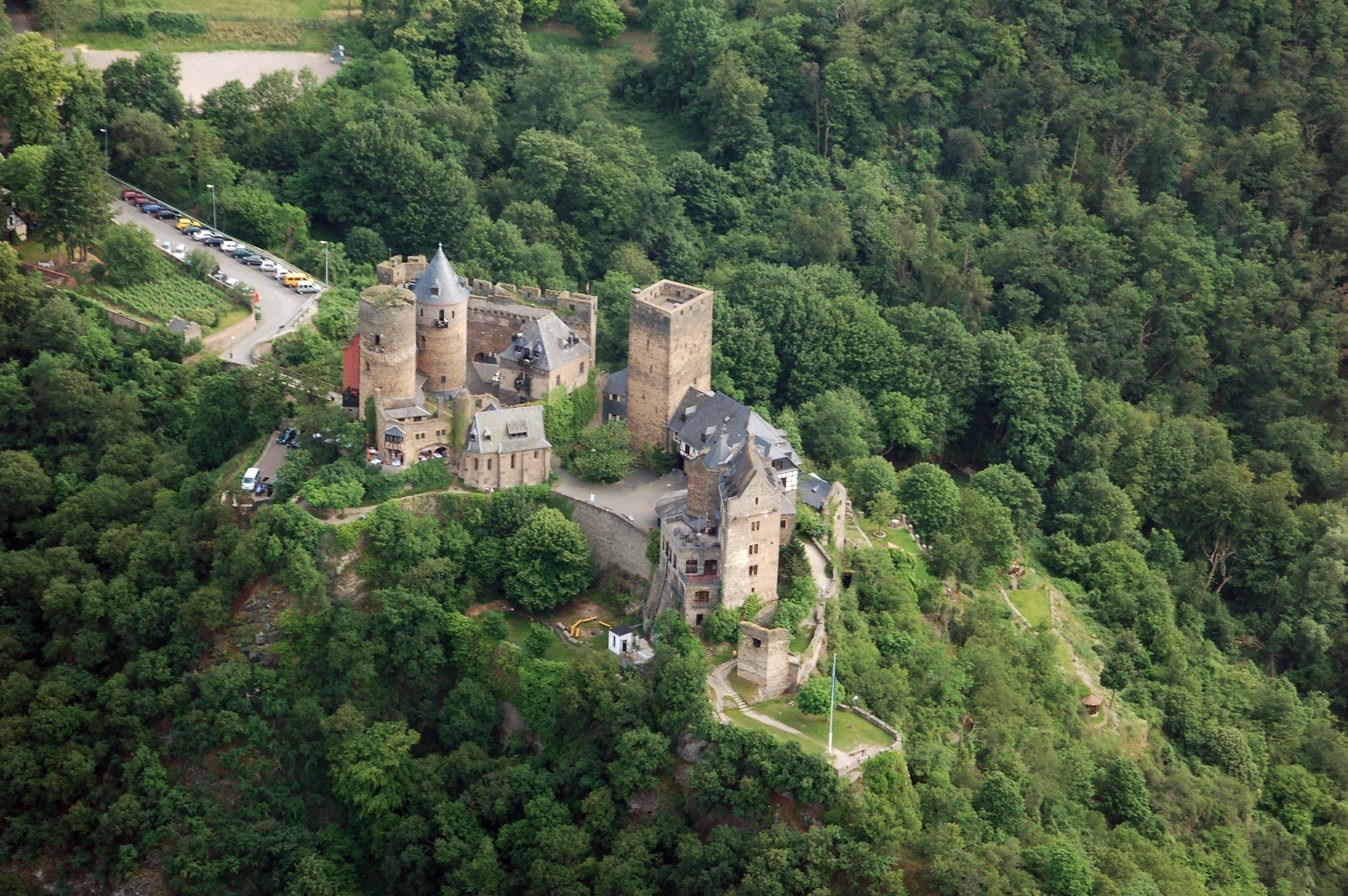
Oberwesel, Schönburg monumental zone

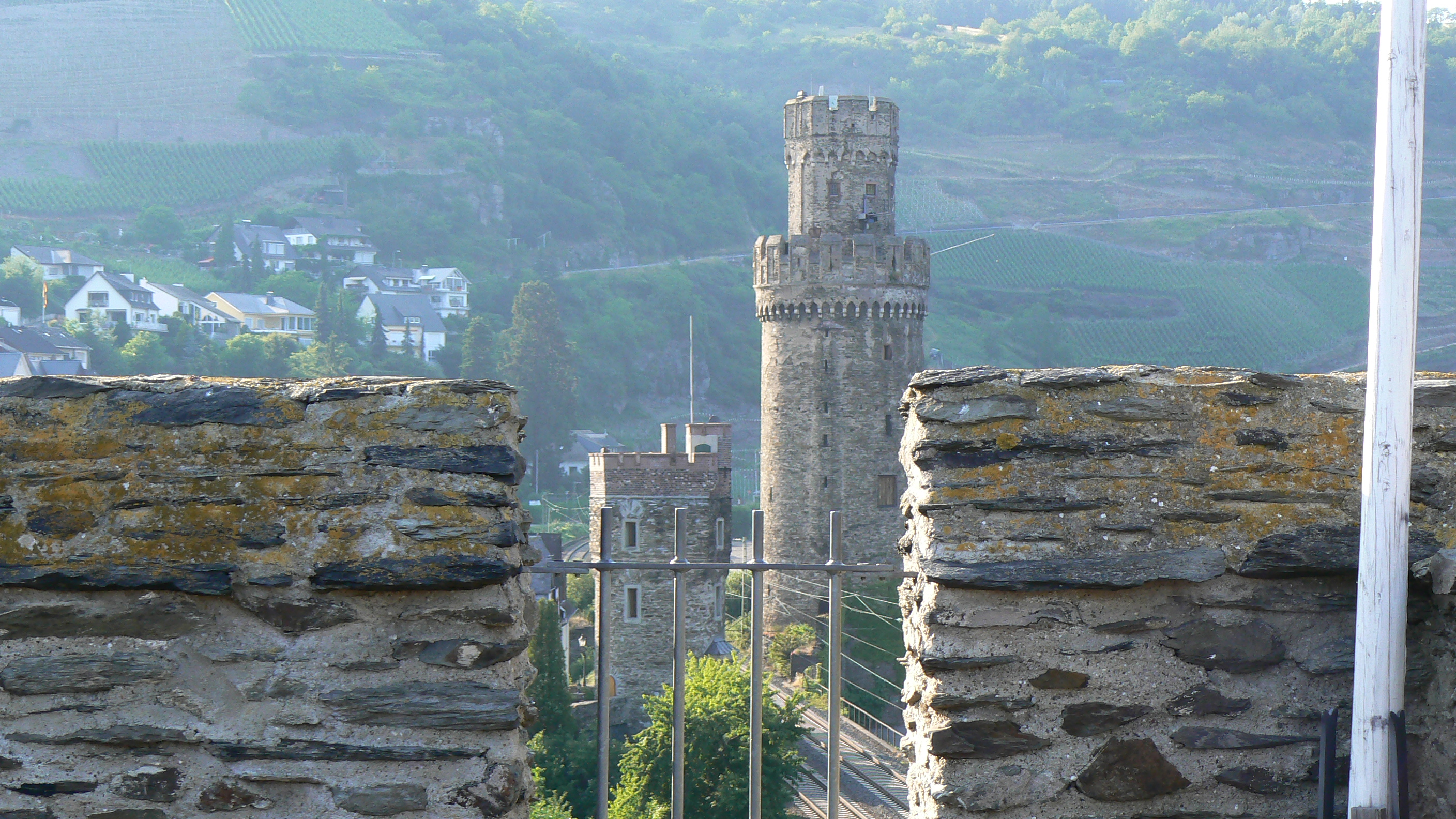
Oberwesel, town wall: Ochsenturm (“Ox Tower”)

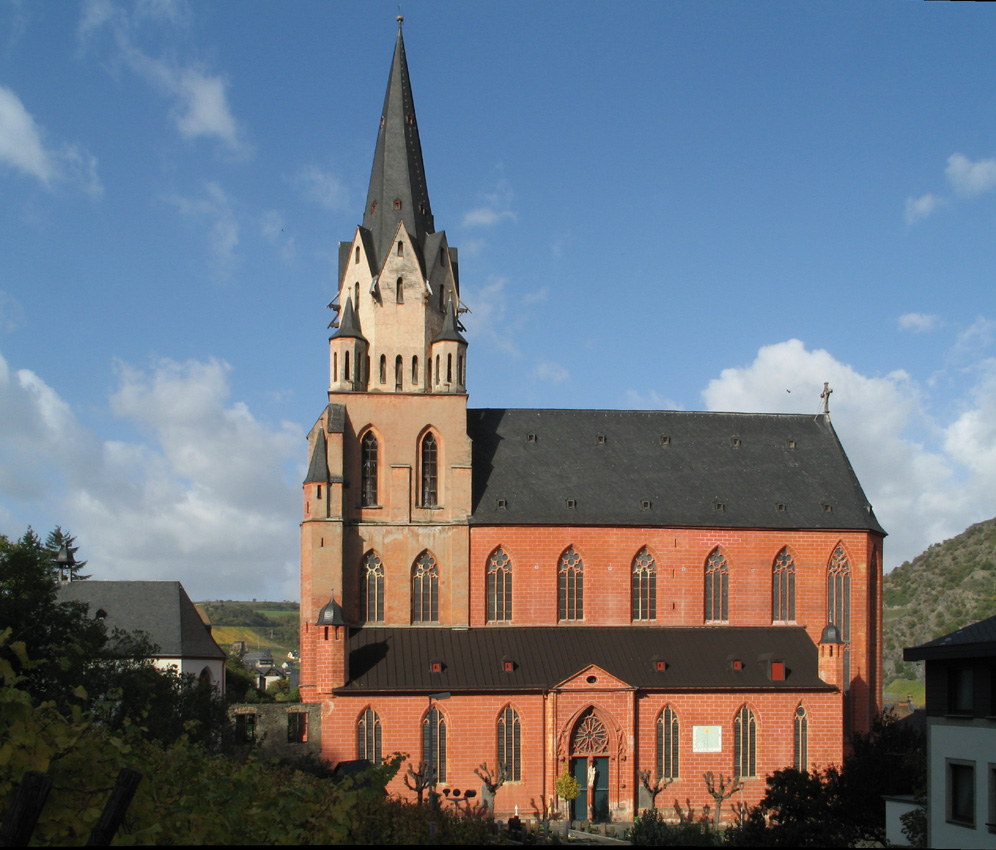
Oberwesel, Liebfrauenstraße 1: Church of Our Lady

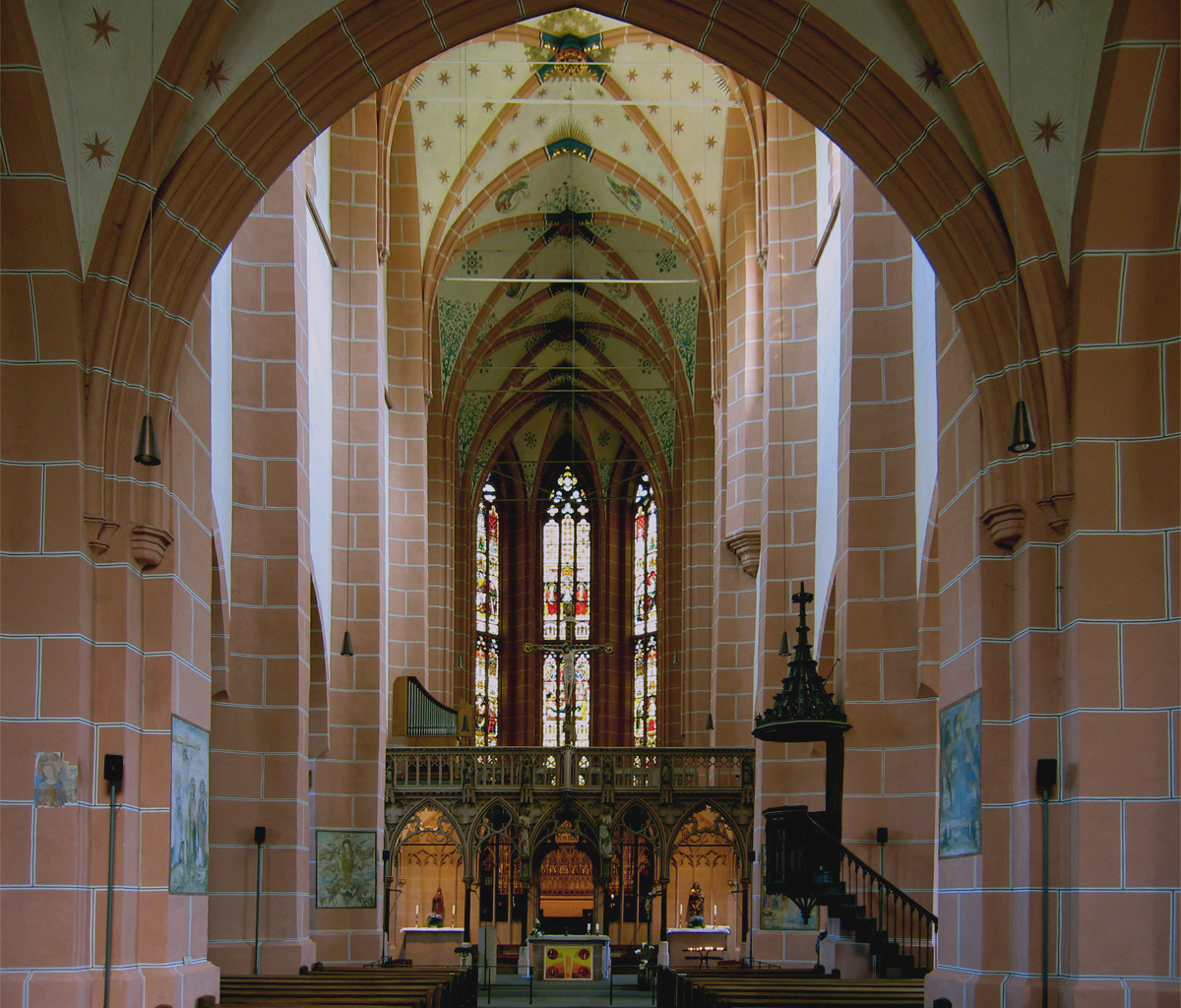
Church of Our Lady – inside

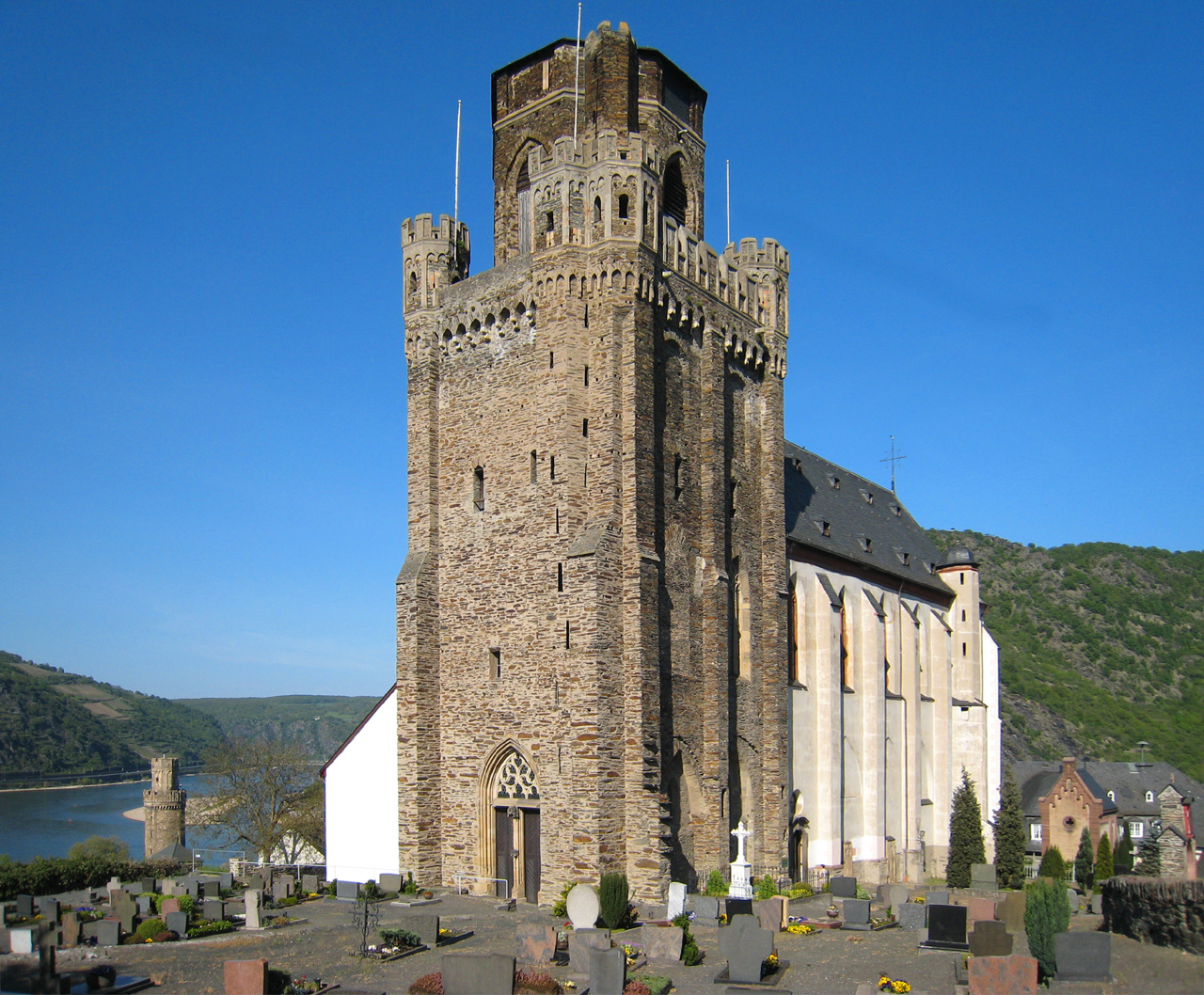
Oberwesel, Martinsberg 2: Saint Martin's Parish Church

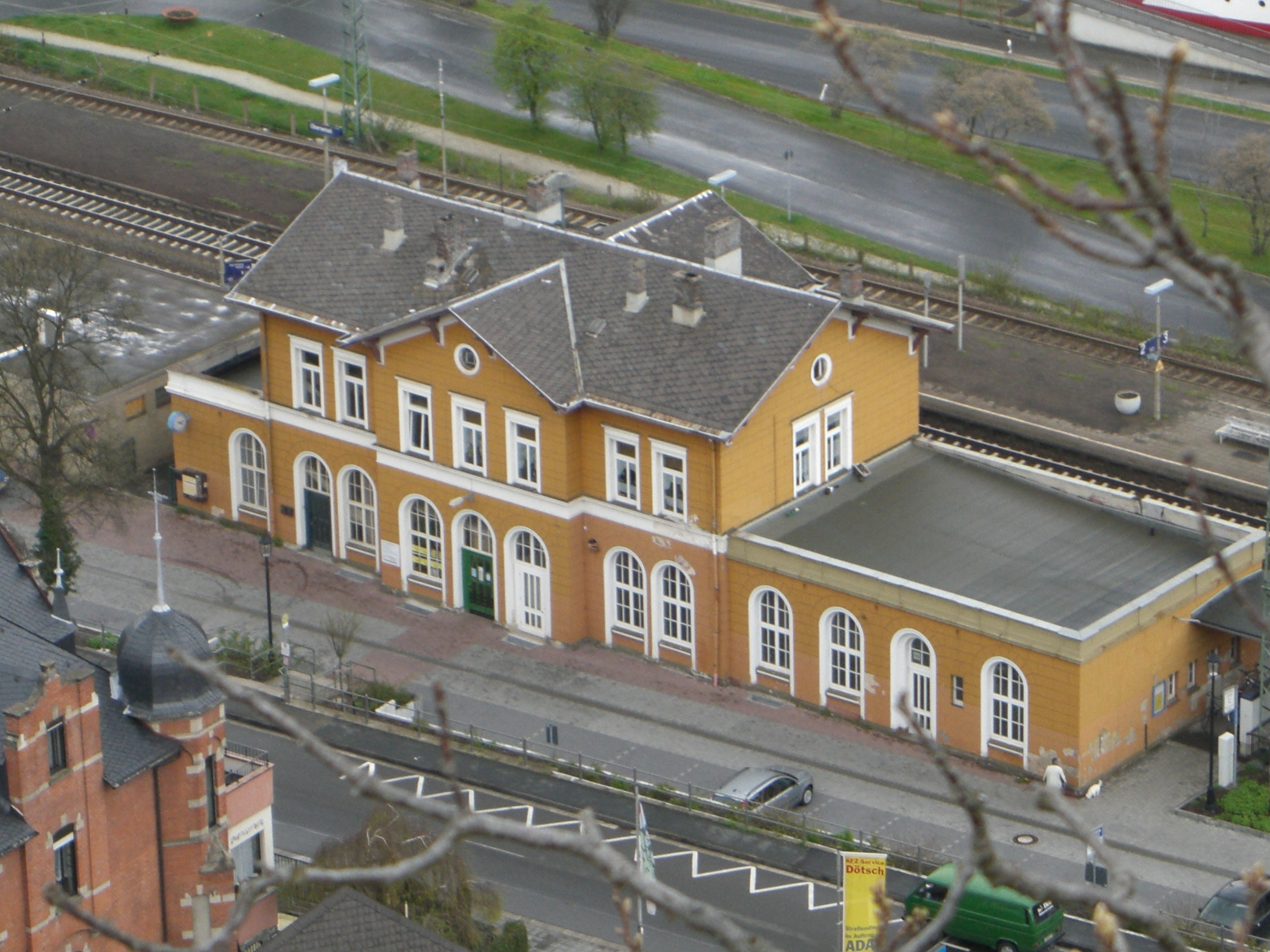
Oberwesel, Mainzer Straße (no number): railway station

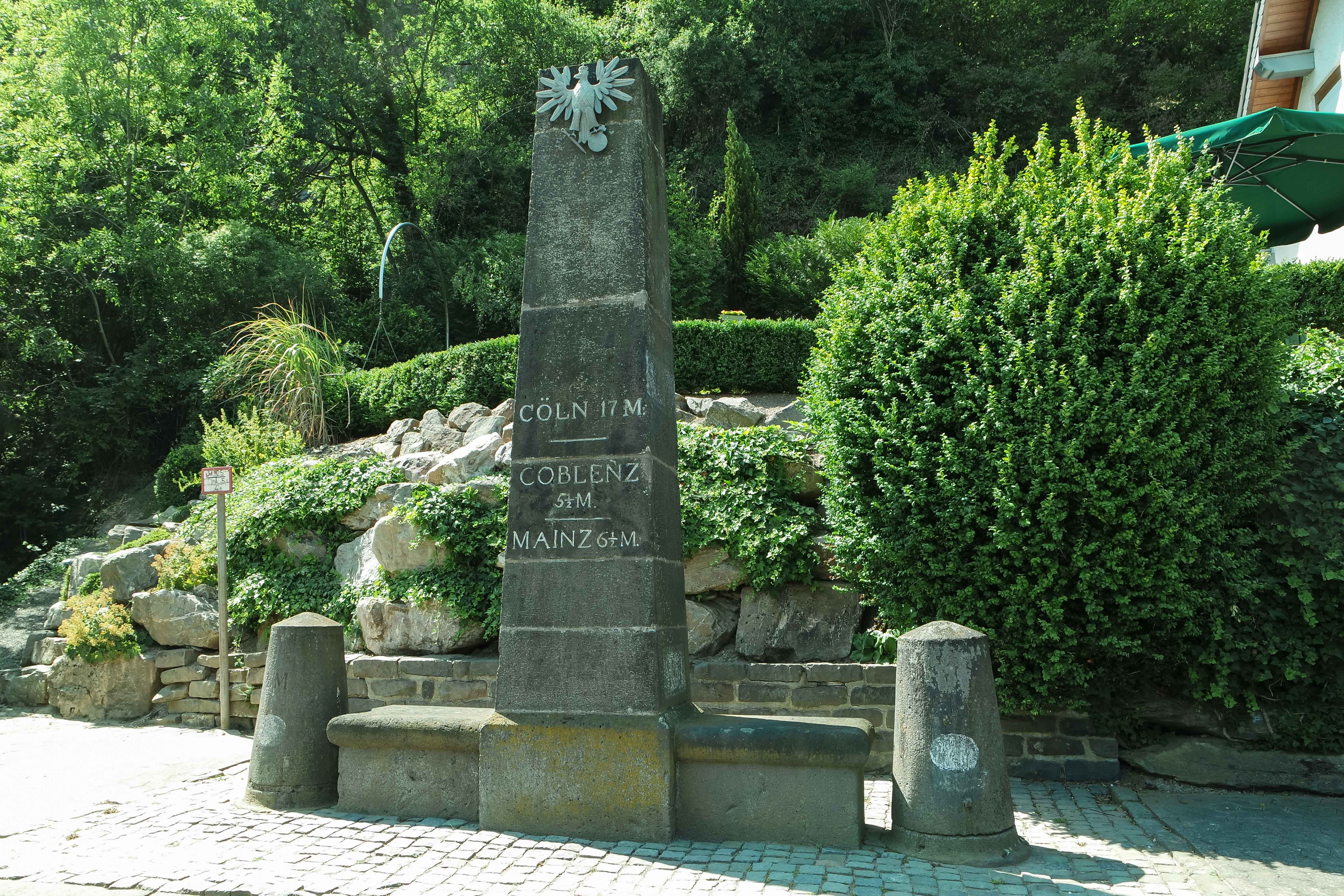
Oberwesel, Mainzer Straße (no number): Prussian milestone

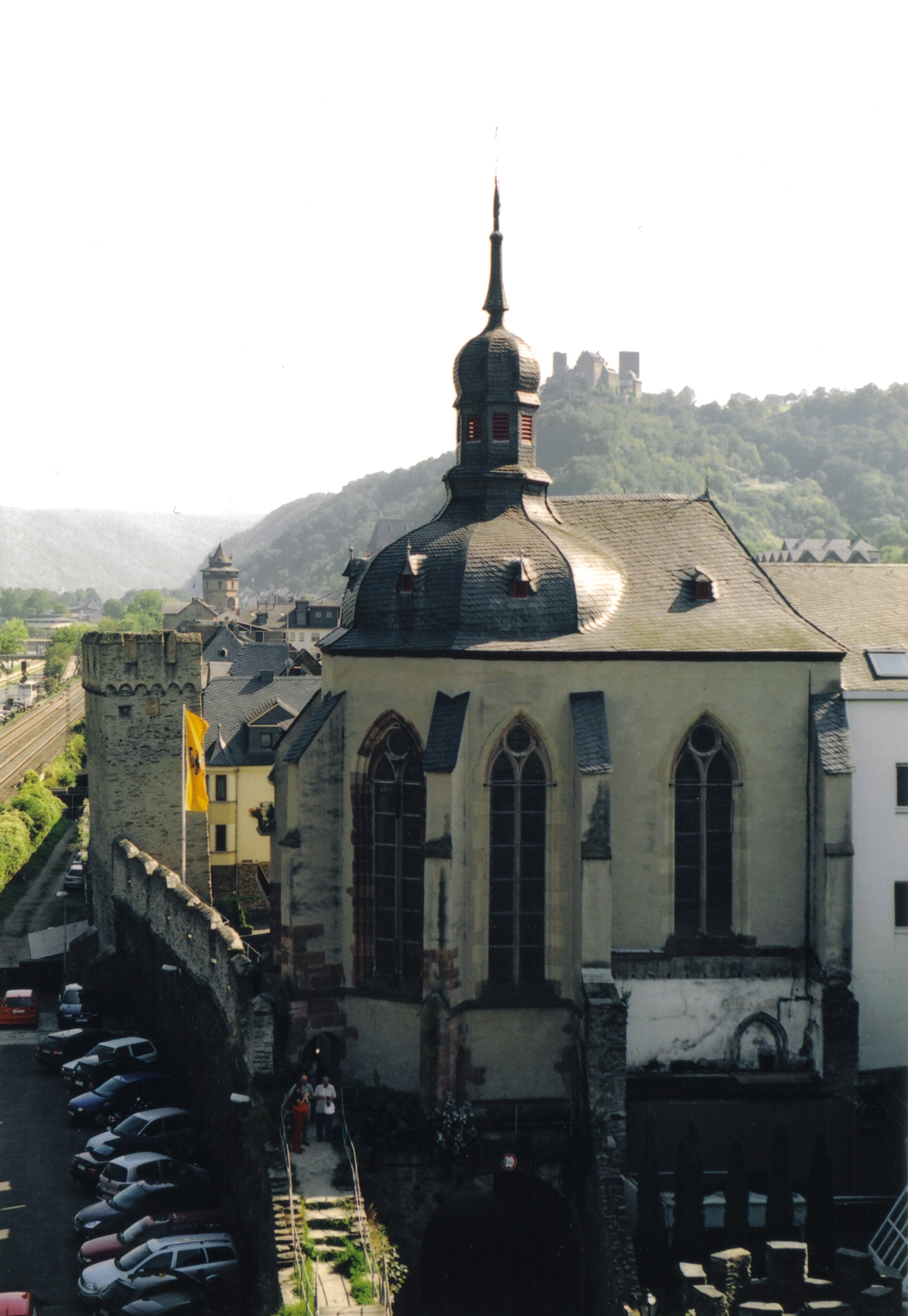
Oberwesel, Wernerstraße: “Saint” Werner's Chapel

==== Oberwesel (main centre) ====
- Evangelical church, beside Chablis-Straße 21 – Gothic Revival brick building, 1897–1899
- Catholic Parish Church of Our Lady (Pfarrkirche Liebfrauen), Liebfrauenstraße 1 (see also below) – one-naved aisleless church with five-eighths quire and ridge turret, latter half of the 14th century; appointments: pulpit, 1619; tomb slabs, 16th and 17th centuries; cloister and vicarage, standing in the south wing, 14th and 15th centuries; various gravestones, 15th to 17th century; at the northeast corner a vicarage, plastered timber-frame house in mixed building styles, crosswise gable, 18th century; graveyard, Late Gothic Crucifixion, 16th century; various gravestones, 19th century; whole complex of buildings with church, cloister with vicarage and graveyard with Saint Michael's Chapel
- Saint Martin's Catholic Parish Church (Pfarrkirche St. Martin), Martinsberg 2 (see also below) – transeptless two-naved basilica; sacristy, about 1300, nave and tower about 1350 to mid 15th century, side nave rebuilt about 1700 after destruction; rectory (Martinsberg 1): two-wing building, timber-frame, 18th century, essentially mediaeval, alterations and expansion in the 19th and 20th centuries; garden with Romanesque baptismal font; graveyard with Fátima Chapel, tomb, churchyard wall; former sexton's hut, jettying, partly solid, earlier half of the 17th century, one-floor timber-frame shed, marked 1625; whole complex of buildings
- Town centre (monumental zone) – widely preserved town appearance, the two churches, Liebfrauen and St. Martin; almost the whole of the town fortifications preserved with 16 (of formerly 21) towers; characteristic town construction arrangement
- Schönburg (monumental zone) – originally an Imperial castle, in 1149 owned by Hermann von Stahleck, until 1166 by Magdeburg, Burggraf (“castle count”) and Vögte were the Imperial ministeriales of Schönburg, 1166 Imperial immediacy, 1216 to Magdeburg once again, by the 14th century at the latest a castle shared by more than one family, 1374 held as fief by Archbishop Kuno of Trier, 1531 in bad structural state, 1689 laid waste, beginning in 1885 partial reconstruction by T. J. Oakley Rhinelander (of, among other things, the lookout corner and the southern lodging), beginning in the 1950s built into a hotel (the area of the two southern keeps and of the southern lodging) and into the House of the Kolping Society (northern lodging and keep, gatetower); building beginning in the earlier half of the 12th century of the northern lodging now preserved as remnants; gatetower, marked 1141/1161; beginning in 1237 building of the southern half of the castle with the two round keeps, the southern lodging, the chapel and the moat; in the earlier half of the 14th century the Hoher Mantel (protective wall), northern keep and bailey; Haus Schönberg, timber-frame house, built in 1886 by Johann Kastor; gravesite of the family Osterroth; belonging with the castle: Schönburg estate upstream as well as the area of the “Elfenlay” between Schönburg and the town and the Church of Our Lady
- Town wall (see also below) – 16 towers and wall, great parts of which are preserved, shortly after 1200, partially raised in the earlier half of the 13th century, expansion in the latter half of the 13th century, walling of the outlying town of Niederburg in der ersten Hälfte of the 14th century, Ummauerung der Vorstadt Kirchhausen in the earlier half of the 15th century
- "Saint" Werner's Chapel, Wernerstraße (see also below) – chapel with substructure, shortly before 1300 until the mid 14th century, repair after destruction about 1700; whole complex of buildings with Wernerkrankenhaus (hospital)
- Borngasse 2 – timber-frame house, partly solid, marked 1659, expansion possibly in the 18th century
- Chablisstraße 2 – timber-frame house, partly solid, plastered, marked 1708, conversion possibly in the earlier half of the 19th century
- Chablisstraße 4 – timber-frame house, partly solid, marked 1586, shop built in, 1919
- Chablisstraße 5 – timber-frame house, partly solid, jettying, marked 1626, addition in the back marked 1754, conversion possibly in the 19th century
- Chablisstraße 65 – former Hertzners-Hollbachs Mühle (mill); timber-frame house, partly solid, early 18th century, window walling about 1600, possibly conversion marked 1719; one-floor commercial building, quarrystone, hipped mansard roof; whole complex of buildings
- Heumarkt 15 – timber-frame house, earlier half of the 18th century
- Heumarkt 17 – timber-frame house, plastered, partly shingled, early 18th century
- Holzgasse 4 – timber-frame house, partly solid, marked 1576
- Holzgasse 6 – timber-frame house, plastered, early 17th century
- Kirchstraße 18 – Classicist plastered building, earlier half of the 19th century
- Kirchstraße 20 – two- or three-floor timber-frame house, partly solid, latter half of the 15th century
- Kirchstraße 39 – town school, so-called Mädchenschule (“girls’ school”); nine-axis sandstone building, marked 1907
- At Kirchstraße 52 – door with skylight, mid 18th century
- Kirchstraße 55 – Weißer Turm (“White Tower”) of the town wall
- Koblenzer Straße 30 – former House of Leyen estate; five-axis lordly quarrystone building, marked 1745, addition possibly in the 19th century
- Koblenzer Straße 57 – plastered timber-frame house, earlier half of the 19th century
- Liebfrauenstraße 9 – shophouse; brick building with plastered façade, about 1920/1930
- At Liebfrauenstraße 10 – door, Rococo frames, latter half of the 18th century
- Liebfrauenstraße 17 – villa; brick building on two-floor basement, 1890
- Liebfrauenstraße 29 – former Catholic school, so-called Knabenschule (“boys’ school”); ten-axis building, building inspector F. Nebel, Koblenz, 1865 interior conversion, 1886 conversion, 1965/1966 entrance moved and addition
- Liebfrauenstraße 29 a-b – two shophouses, 1908/1909
- Liebfrauenstraße 33 – wine cellar building; Swiss style, about 1865, expansion 1927/1928, conversion marked 1930; secondhand cellar lintel, marked 1654
- Liebfrauenstraße 47 – timber-frame house plastered, possibly early 19th century, triaxial addition in the 19th century
- Liebfrauenstraße 58 – brick building, late 19th century
- Mainzer Straße – Prussian milestone, obelisk, about 1820
- Mainzer Straße (no number) – railway station; reception building 1858/1859, renovation and lavatory building 1925, expansion 1907/1908
- Mainzer Straße 6 – winemaker's villa, about 1900
- Marktplatz 1 – timber-frame house, partly solid, middle third of the 18th century
- Marktplatz 4 – timber-frame house, partly solid, jettying, mid to late 17th century
- Martinsberg (no number) – Catholic youth home; one- or two-floor plastered building, 1923–1925
- Martinsberg 3 – former sexton's hut of Saint Martin's Church; timber-frame house in mixed building styles, earlier half of the 17th century
- Oberstraße 1 – brick building with knee wall, marked 1872
- Oberstraße 11/13 – former church of the Minorite monastery (see also below); two-naved basilica, 1270/1290 to 1340, sacristy, 13th to 15th century, cloister wing, essentially mediaeval, conversion in the 17th or 18th century, monastery wall; Crucifixion group, earlier half of the 18th century; former grammar school, essentially mediaeval, 15th or 16th century, conversions from 17th to 19th century; former Electoral winery, timber-frame building, partly solid, mid 19th century; hall cellar, 15th or 16th century; whole complex of buildings
- Rathausstraße 1 – quarrystone building, half-hipped roof, middle third of the 19th century; sandstone portal, marked 1629
- Rathausstraße 3 – three-floor quarrystone building, middle third of the 19th century, wooden sculpture of “Saint” Werner, about 1900
- Near Rathausstraße 5 – well, cast-iron hand pump, mid 19th century
- Rathausstraße 6 – town hall; three-floor quarrystone building, partly slated timber framing, 1926/1927, architect T. Wildemans, Bonn, central structure 1847-1850
- Rathausstraße 9 – shophouse, about 1910, Baroque cellar
- Rathausstraße 14 – old bakehouse; one-and-a-half-floor timber-frame house, mid 19th century, conversion 1885; secondhand corner upright, marked 1659
- At Rathausstraße 16 – inscription on gateway arch in capitals: Annis Cum Centum a Suecis Exu(sta) 1719 (on the keystone) Mar(tin) Augsthalers ope refecta fui; door and skylight, early 18th century
- Rathausstraße 23 – brick building, about 1865
- Rheinstraße 5 – timber-frame house, partly solid, marked 1765
- Rheinstraße 7 – three-floor timber-frame house, partly solid, possibly from the 17th century, additions and conversions in the 18th and 20th centuries
- Schaarplatz 4 – five-axis brick building, mixed building styles from Classicist and Renaissance Revival, marked 1887
- Steingasse 6 – timber-frame house, partly solid, earlier half of the 17th century, addition in the 18th century
- Unterstraße 1 – timber-frame house, partly solid, marked 1658, possibly conversion in the 19th century
- Unterstraße 8 – Haus Schönburg; L-shaped, three-floor quarrystone building, second fourth of the 19th century (before 1850), essentially possibly mediaeval, Schönburg coat of arms, Schönburger Turm (tower) of the town wall incorporated
- Unterstraße 12-14 – estate of the Eberbach Monastery with Saint Catherine's Chapel; aisleless church, possibly from the latter half of the 14th century; two-winged estate building, solid and Fachwerk, earlier half of the 18th century; whole complex of buildings
- Unterstraße 18 – Haus Gertum, quarrystone building, hipped roof, about 1830
- Wernerstraße 1 – plastered timber-frame house, 18th century
- Border stones, west of town – seven border stones, one marked 1616
- Jewish graveyard (on the Graue Lay, northwest of Oberwesel) (monumental zone) – opened in the earlier half of the 18th century, expanded possibly in the earlier half of the 19th century with building of the two main paths; with iron pale fence and gate with Star of David from the late 19th century; fenced area with 66 gravestones: 9 from the 18th century, mainly 19th and early 20th century, newest gravestone 1942
- Kalvarienbergkapelle ("Mount Calvary Chapel") and Stations of the Cross, Auf'm Kalvarienberg – Gothic Revival quarrystone aisleless church, 1843–1845; remnants of a Crucifixion group; 12 Stations of the Cross, Bildstock type, including two small chapels, from 1849 on; Lamentation of Christ, 16th century; whole complex of buildings
- Warriors’ memorial 1866 and 1870/1871, near the Schönburg, across from the youth hostel – towards 1895, design by Heinrich Schuler, Kirchheimbolanden
- Niederbachstraße 120 – Schneidersmühle (mill), timber-frame house, partly solid, 18th century, essentially older, marked 1607, painting work from the 19th century, millrace; whole complex of buildings with shed
- Transformer tower, at the castle gate on the Momering – 1922, architect possibly T. Wildeman
- Tunnel portals – portals of the Kammerecktunnel and Bettunnel, mid 19th century

==== Weiler-Boppard ====
- Am Weinberg 60 – Saint Apollonia’s Chapel (St.-Apollonia-Kapelle); aisleless church, earlier half of the 18th century
- Near Am Weinberg 60 – bakehouse, one-floor plastered building, 1830/1840

==== Dellhofen ====
- Holy Cross Catholic Church (Kirche zum Heiligen Kreuz), Rheinhöhenstraße 24 – tower of the previous, Gothic Revival church, 1875/1876, nave under asymmetrically set saddle roof, 1961
- Rheinhöhenstraße 19 – timber-frame Quereinhaus (a combination residential and commercial house divided for these two purposes down the middle, perpendicularly to the street), partly solid and slated, early 19th century
- Rheinhöhenstraße 26 – bakehouse; one-floor brick building, latter half of the 19th century
- Schulweg 6/8 – single-peak building; timber-frame building, mid 18th century

==== Engehöll ====
- Our Lady of Sorrows Catholic Church (branch church; Filialkirche zur Schmerzhaften Muttergottes), Am Kapellenberg – quarrystone aisleless church, 1923–1925

==== Langscheid ====
- Saint Nicholas’s Catholic Church (branch church; Filialkirche St. Nikolaus), Pfalzgrafenstraße 2 – aisleless church, 1782/1783, lengthening and new tower; whole complex of buildings with surrounding area
- Bacharacher Straße 2 – bakehouse; plastered timber-frame building, marked 1888
- Brunnenweg 1 – timber-frame Quereinhaus, late 19th or early 20th century
- Kirchweg 1 – timber-frame Quereinhaus, partly solid, marked 1718, barn 19th century; whole complex of buildings
- Oberweseler Straße 4 – timber-frame Quereinhaus, partly solid, stable building; whole complex of buildings
- Pfalzgrafenstraße 1 – school; plastered timber-frame building, partly slated, 1841
- Pfalzgrafenstraße 51 – timber-frame Quereinhaus, partly solid, 1916; former village smithy, partly slated, marked 19(2)3; whole complex of buildings

=== Further information about buildings and sites ===
The town wall, which was built in the early 13th century and some of whose parts are open to the public, was expanded and strengthened in the 14th century, and with 16 defensive towers – among them the Hospitalgassenturm ("Hospital Lane Tower"), the Steingassenturm ("Stone Lane Tower"), the Katzenturm ("Cats' Tower") and the Ochsenturm ("Ox's Tower"), which is crenellated and has an octagonal top tower, making it a type of butter-churn tower (Butterfassturm) – is the best preserved girding wall anywhere on the Rhine Gorge. There was planning to open further sections to the public in 2006.

"Saint" Werner's Chapel is nowadays more properly known as the Mutter-Rosa-Kapelle, since its consecration to Werner has been rescinded and Werner has been stricken from the roll of saints. The chapel is now named after Rosa Flesch, the founder of a Franciscan order in the 19th century. Physically, it actually consists only of the quire of the chapel attached to the hospital, which itself was destroyed in 1689.

Building work on the Church of Our Lady (Liebfrauenkirche, or Pfarrkirche Liebfrauen as it is styled above) began in 1308. In 1331, the church was consecrated and it was completed in 1375. It was built on the spot once occupied by another church, which was first mentioned in 1213. From the old church, the new one took over an endowment for secular clergy (as opposed to regular clergy). Given its architecture and appointments (golden altar, rood screen, wall paintings), it is among the Rhineland’s most important Gothic churches.

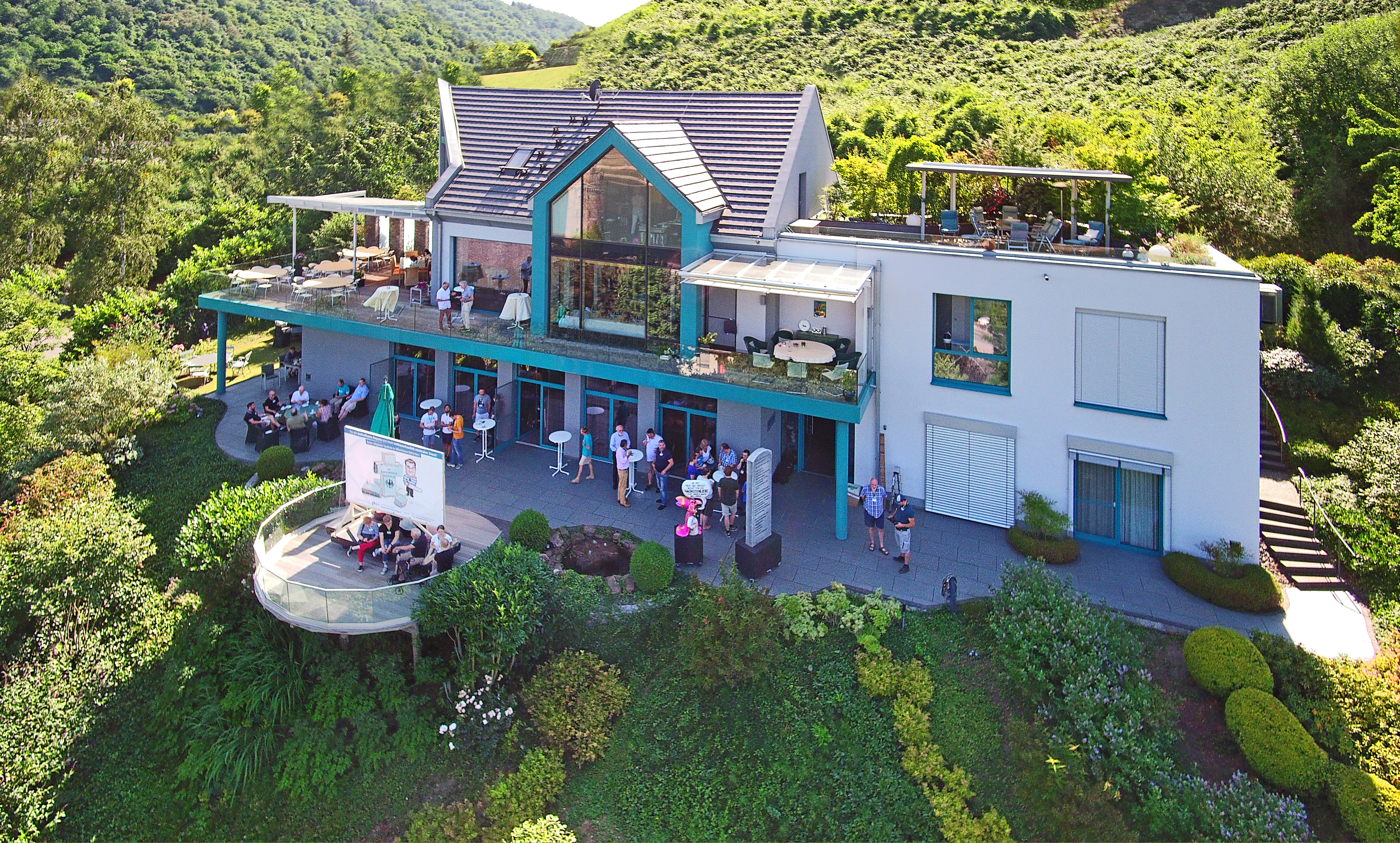
Oberwesel, Haus Weiblick. Seat of the Giordano Bruno Foundation and seat of the Institute for Secular Law

Saint Martin's Church, too, is a Gothic building that arose on a foregoing church’s old site. It was built in 1350, but was not finished owing to strained finances. The tower, which in the Wesel War was incorporated into the town wall as a defensive structure, is an illustrative example of ecclesiastical defensive architecture in the Rhineland. Much of the Gothic appointments has been destroyed. Preserved, however, are a few wall paintings from about 1500 to 1600.

The Minorite monastery was a Franciscan institution founded in 1242 and dissolved in 1802 by Napoleon. In the great town fire of 1836, it was destroyed, and has been a ruin ever since.

Haus Weitblick was opened in 2011. It is the seat of the Giordano Bruno Foundation and the seat of the Institute for Secular Law.

=== Museums ===
- Museum der Stadt Oberwesel (town museum at the Kulturhaus Oberwesel - Kulturstiftung Hütte)

=== Regular events ===
- Yearly concert Wir machen Musik ("We make/are making music") staged by the Oberwesel "Kolping" family
- Weinhexennacht ("Wine Witches' Night")
- Mittelalterliches Spectaculum Oberwesel (“Mediaeval Spectacle”) at Whitsun in even-numbered years
- Mittelrhein-Marathon from Oberwesel to Koblenz in June
- Rhein in Flammen - Nacht der 1000 Feuer ("Night of the Thousand Fires") with traditional parade on following Sunday, each year on the second Saturday in September
- Wine market on the marketplace and on Rathausstraße, on each second and third weekend in September

=== Winegrowing ===
Within the Middle Rhine wine region, Oberwesel is one of the biggest winegrowing centres. The winemaking appellation – Großlage – of Schloss Schönburg encompasses 72 ha. Individual winemakers within this appellation – Einzellagen – are Sieben Jungfrauen, Oelsberg, Bienenberg, St. Martinsberg, Goldemund, Bernstein and Römerkrug. The vineyards are steeply terraced and 80% of the area is planted with Riesling and 20% with other white grape varieties (Müller-Thurgau, Kerner, Pinot blanc) and less often with red varieties (Pinot noir, Dornfelder). All kinds of wine (mild, half-dry and dry) and quality levels (Prädikat Kabinett to the odd ice wine) are produced. Recently in the Oelsberg vineyards, some light Flurbereinigung was undertaken, and the now newly planted vineyards have been provided with an irrigation facility. This was meant to safeguard this traditional Einzellage, for not only will it spare the winemakers some work, but it will also ensure good yields even in dry summers.

Some of the 30 or so winemaking estates in town have been under family ownership for more than 200 years; some also keep wine bars in the town.

== Famous people ==
=== Sons and daughters of the town ===
- Johann von Wesel (b. 1425; d. 1481 in Mainz), German theologian
- Joseph Adamy (b.1778; d. 1849), mine owner and politician
