= Institute for Secular Law =

Institute for Secular Law (German: Institut für Weltanschauungsrecht – ifw) is a non-governmental organisation founded in Oberwesel (Germany) in 2017, that promotes the principles of secularism, separation of state and religion, and the neutrality of the state as referred to in the Basic Law.

== Organisation ==
The institute was established as part of the Giordano Bruno Foundation (gbs) in Oberwesel in 2017, and is stated to have emerged from the gbs legal aid fund, a private donation from the retired head of strategy at the German Federal Criminal Police Office (BKA), Ernst-Heinrich Ahlf, who serves on the ifw advisory board. Current expenditures of ifw are covered and reported annually by gbs.

The board of directors is led by Jörg Scheinfeld (since 2022), previously by Jacqueline Neumann (2017-2022), and the advisory board consists of Seyran Ateş, Ninon Colneric, Eric Hilgendorf, Ingrid Matthäus-Maier, Reinhard Merkel, Ludwig A. Minelli, Holm Putzke, Rolf Schwanitz, among others.

== Activities ==
The institute promotes the principles of secularism, separation of state and religion, and the neutrality of the state as referred to in the Basic Law. It conducts legal analyses and organizes support for affected persons, groups and organisations in those legal cases where it considers that human rights, the freedom of religion as well as freedom from religion in Germany, and the rule of law have been violated by religious politics or practices. It states to operate politically independent, non-partisan and not commercially oriented, and to cooperate with all persons and organisations irrespective of their religious and non-religious preconceptions, provided they pursue rationally justified, evidence-based, neutral and fair legal norms.

It publishes the edition "Schriften zum Weltanschauungsrecht" at Nomos Verlag. It offers the largest publicly accessible commented collection of judgements of the Federal Constitutional Court in this legal field (in German). The variety of topics covered by the institute include the constitutional roots of the secular state, freedom of belief and non-belief, medically assisted suicide, sexual self-determination, abortion, genital mutilation, criminal prosecution in religious organisations and networks (e. g. in the Catholic Church's sex abuse and cover-up system in Germany), the collection of church taxes by the state based on baptisms of infants and minors, the collection of special church fees from atheists and Muslims by the state, church labour law and religious exceptions from EU and German Anti-discrimination law, 'blasphemy paragraph' of the German Criminal Code, the use of religious symbols (e. g. crucifixes, Islamic veils) in state schools, the justice system or further public institutions, among others.

The institute criticized the promotion of fundamental Islamic organisations by German government and state sponsoring of interests of Islamic religious groups on several occasions where it noted anti-constitutional objectives and an undermining of universal human rights. In 2020, by way of depicting the German Chancellor, the Minister of Justice and the Chair of the Central Council of Muslims in Germany it issued 'seven constitutional reminder cards'. Furthermore, it supports the right to freedom of expression against blocking, bans and cancel culture on social media platforms (e. g. Flensburg court case of ex-Muslim activist Amed Sherwan vs. Facebook Ireland Ltd.).

Notable activities that received broader media coverage include the pushing of criminal charges against sexual offenders and officials of the Catholic Church by the state attorneys at the seats of all 27 dioceses in Germany (2018), the case of a non-denominational French and a non-denominational ex-GDR citizen that were requested to pay church tax (2019), criminal charges of defamation and incitement of hatred in the case of the fundamental Christian anti-abortionist 'babykaust'-platform operator (2021), and the appeal to the Federal Constitutional Court to declare paragraph 219a of Germany's criminal code ('advertisement of medical abortion services') unconstitutional and void (2021).

Some of the legal disputes and court cases are said to have a "disastrous" public effect on the image of the churches, as stated from the perspective of the Catholic Church.
