= Reinhard Merkel =

German swimmer

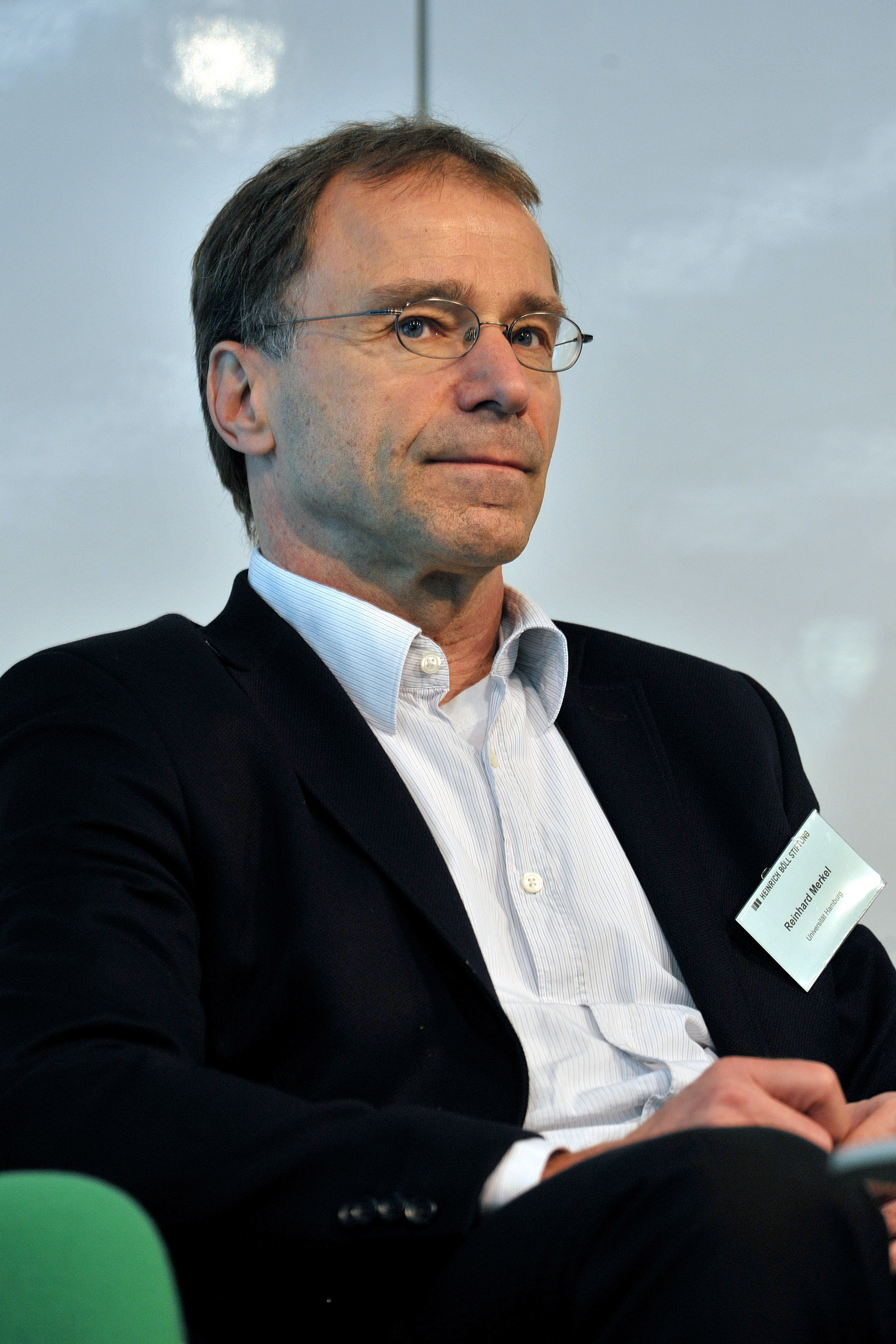
- Reinhard Merkel in 2011

Personal information
- Born: 12 April 1950 (age 76) Hof an der Saale, Germany
- Height: 1.80 m (5 ft 11 in)
- Weight: 73 kg (161 lb)

Sport
- Sport: Swimming
- Club: SV Blau-Weiß Bochum
Medal record
Men's swimming
Representing West Germany
Universiade
Bronze medal – third place	1970 Turin	400 m medley

Reinhard Merkel (born 12 April 1950) is a professor in criminal law and philosophy of law and a retired West German swimmer. He competed at the 1968 Summer Olympics in the 200 m and 400 m individual medley and finished in sixth place in the latter event.

After retiring from swimming he studied law at the Ruhr University Bochum and Heidelberg University. He also studied law, philosophy and literature at LMU Munich, where he passed his state examination. After that, he worked as a researcher at the Max Planck Institute for Foreign and International Social Law and at the Institute of Philosophy in Munich.

Between 1988 and 1990, he was an editor of the newspaper Die Zeit. In 1991, he won the Jean Améry Award for Essay Writing.

After defending his PhD in 1993 at LMU Munich and habilitation in 1997 at Goethe University Frankfurt, he worked as university professor of law at Bielefeld University, the University of Rostock and since 2000 at the University of Hamburg.

He wrote a number of books and other publications discussing neuroethics, bioethics and embryonic stem cell manipulations. Since April 2008, he has been a member of The Hinxton Group: An International Consortium on Stem Cells, Ethics and Law, which is based in Hinxton, UK, and Baltimore, USA. In January 2011 he was elected to the German Academy of Sciences Leopoldina. He is a member of the advisory boards of the Institute for Secular Law and the Giordano Bruno Foundation. He was a member of the German Ethics Council for two terms from 2012 to 2020.

== Selected publications ==
- Reinhard Merkel (1994). Strafrecht und Satire im Werk von Karl Kraus. Nomos-Verlag-Ges. ISBN 978-3-7890-3549-4.
- Reinhard Merkel (2001). Früheuthanasie: Rechtsethische und strafrechtliche Grundlagen ärztlicher Entscheidungen über Leben und Tod in der Neonatalmedizin. Nomos Verlagsges.MBH + Company. ISBN 978-3-7890-7151-5.
- Reinhard Merkel (2002). Forschungsobjekt Embryo: verfassungsrechtliche und ethische Grundlagen der Forschung an menschlichen embryonalen Stammzellen. Deutscher Taschenbuch Verlag. ISBN 978-3-423-36294-8.
- Reinhard Merkel (2008). Strafrecht, Allgemeiner Teil. Mauke & Schweitzer.
- Reinhard Merkel (2008). Willensfreiheit und rechtliche Schuld: eine strafrechtsphilosophische Untersuchung; (Vortrag, gehalten am 18. Januar 2006). Nomos. ISBN 978-3-8329-3204-6.
- Reinhard Merkel; G. Boer; J. Fegert; T. Galert; D. Hartmann; B. Nuttin; S. Rosahl (2010). Intervening in the Brain: Changing Psyche and Society. Springer. ISBN 978-3-642-07982-5.
