= Cruelty =

Pleasure in inflicting suffering

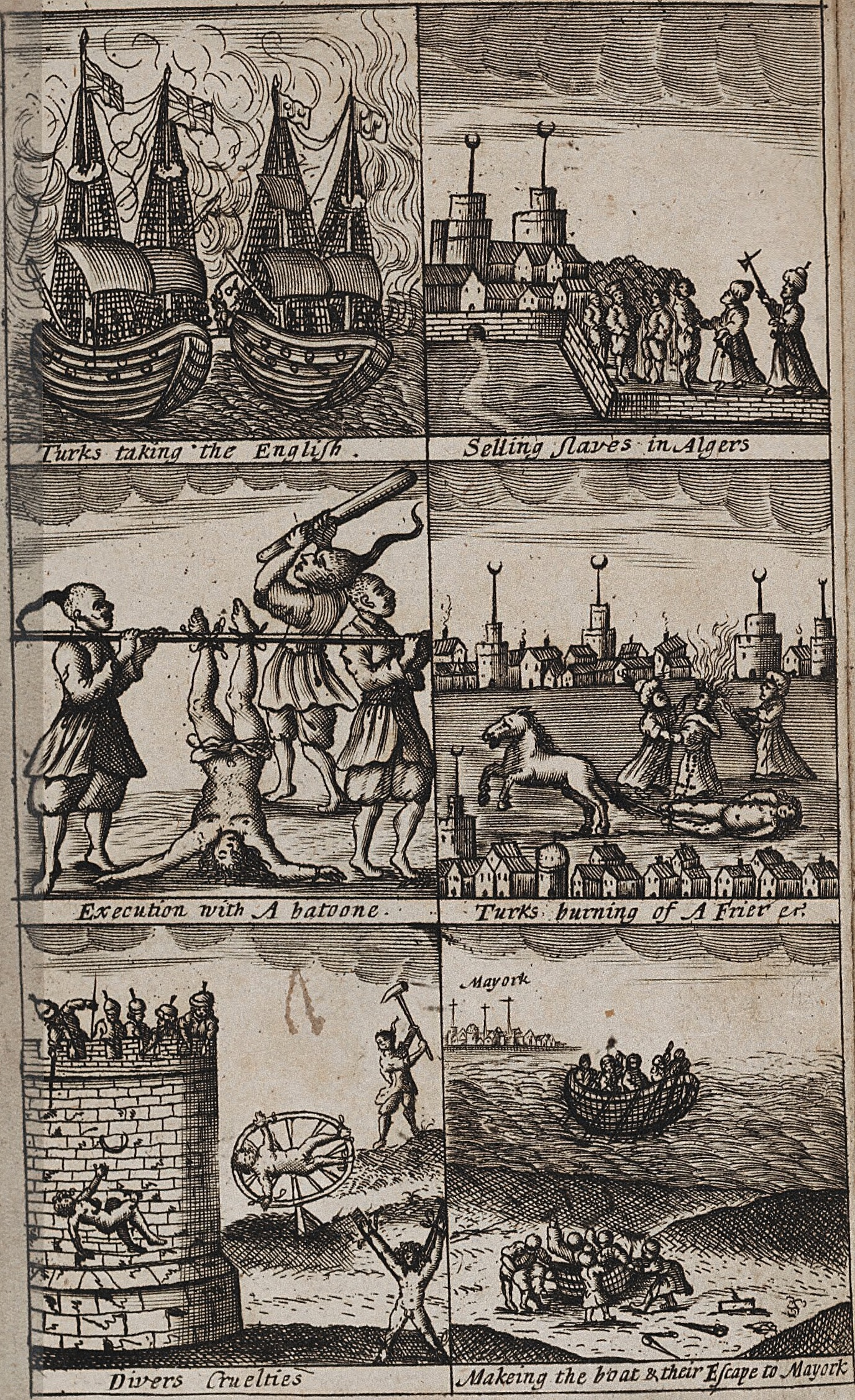
An old poster depicting cruelty, including selling slaves in Algiers, execution, burning, and other cruelties.

Cruelty is the intentional infliction of suffering or the inaction towards another's suffering when a clear remedy is readily available. Sadism can also be related to this form of action or concept.

== Etymology ==
The term comes from Middle English, via the Old French term "crualte", which is based on Latin "crudelitas", from "crudelis".

== Usage in law ==
The term cruelty is often used in law and criminology with regard to the treatment of animals, children, spouses, and prisoners. When cruelty to animals is discussed, it often refers to unnecessary suffering. In criminal law, it refers to punishment, torture, victimization, draconian measures, and cruel and unusual punishment. In divorce cases, many jurisdictions permit a cause of action for cruel and inhumane treatment.

In law, cruelty is "the infliction of physical or mental distress, especially when considered a determinant in granting a divorce." According to Barozzo, there are four distinct conceptions of cruelty in criminal law. “The differences between these conceptions of cruelty rest on the types of agency, victimization, causality, and values that they employ."

The first is the agent-objective conception, which is “exemplified by […] agency that goes above in degree and beyond in type the [suffering] allowed by applicable norms.” Under this conception, the victim suffered cruelty in light of “the objective character of the act or treatment” she was subjected to. Cruelty, in this sense, is defined as an “inclination of the mind toward the side of harshness”. Any punishment or other treatment that surpasses the scope of sufficiency and ventures into possibility is classified as excessive, and therefore, cruel.

The second conception is agent-subjective, in which “cruelty obtains only when the agent's deviant behavior is accompanied by the fault of character consisting in deriving personal delight from causing and witnessing suffering”. This conception is best understood under the presumption that punishment or other violence is a means to restore the offset in the cosmic order of the universe caused by wrongdoing. Anything that goes beyond what is necessary for this restoration, then, is cruel; the peace and harmony is not balanced with excessive punishment or violence—the scale of wrongdoing merely tips to the other side. For example, the Eighth Amendment of the U.S. Constitution prohibits cruel and unusual punishment, which means that we must “inquire into a prison official’s state of mind […]” when determining that the agent is not taking pleasure in inflicting pain and that punishment does not exceed the crime.

The third conception is victim-subjective, in which the “element of cruelty rests in the victim's intense experience of suffering”. Here, the pain or the sense of degradation and humiliation experienced particularly and uniquely by the victim is considered. Recognizing cruelty, then, requires reference to our compassion rather than some normative standard of reasonableness. Continuing with the example of punishment, the state’s intention is not relevant in determining whether a punishment is cruel. According to the law, “ill-treatment must attain a minimum level of severity”, and this minimum is determined by “all the circumstances of the case, such as the duration of the treatment, its physical or mental effects and, in some cases, the sex, age, and state of health of the victim, etc.”

The fourth conception is victim-objective, which “refers to severe violations of the respect, recognition, and care that the unconditional and inherent dignity of each and every individual command”. Under this view, “cruelty occurs when a grave violation of human dignity that in normal circumstances would amount to cruelty is caused by individuals or by the operation of impersonal institutions, structures or social processes, even if the victim is unaware of his predicament”.

Beyond serving as an analytical framework, these four conceptions—the distinctive features of each as well as their collective evolution—reflect the reality that “the phenomenon of cruelty […] is a human-made problem that calls for preventive and corrective responses”.

== Literary references ==
George Eliot, in the short story "Janet's Repentance" from Scenes of Clerical Life, stated that "cruelty, like every other vice, requires no motive outside itself — it only requires opportunity." Philosopher Bertrand Russell argued that almost all marriage customs involve cruelty towards those who do not follow them, meaning there was no rational basis for condemning one custom or another as sinful; he concluded that "the cruelty habitually practised in punishing it is unnecessary...the infliction of cruelty with a good conscience is a delight to moralists. That is why they invented hell." Gilbert K. Chesterton stated that "cruelty is, perhaps, the worst kind of sin. Intellectual cruelty is certainly the worst kind of cruelty."

== See also ==
- Abuse
- Cruelty-free
- Everyday sadism
- Sadism (disambiguation)
- Schadenfreude
- Spite
- The Four Stages of Cruelty
- Theatre of Cruelty
