= Everyday sadism =

Finding pleasure in inflicting pain

Everyday sadism (also known as subclinical sadism or simply sadism) is a personality trait characterized by the enjoyment of inflicting or witnessing pain upon other people or animals. Those who fit the characteristic are referred to as "sadists" or as "sadistic". Sadism has been associated with a lack of empathy, and with psychopathic traits.

== Etymology ==
The word "sadism" was coined in the year 1888, with the meaning of "love of cruelty". It derived from the title of Donatien Alphonse François, Marquis de Sade, as he was notorious for engaging in cruel sexual acts that he would come to glorify in his novels.

The word sadism is often used casually to denote the enjoyment or the willingness to engage in cruel acts.

== As a concept in psychology ==
Sadism is also used in psychological contexts, albeit in its more extreme forms, such as in criminal or sexual contexts. Psychologists Delroy Paulhus and Donald Dutton have asserted that sadistic behavior is so common throughout history that it can be said that sadism lies deeper in the human condition. They also assert that research on the personality style was not viable until the creation of new psychometrics, such as the Varieties of Sadistic Tendencies scale. Studies were done on the behavior of sadists. One strategy implemented was asking who would volunteer to kill bugs. As expected by the researchers, sadists volunteered to kill bugs at greater rates than did nonsadists.

One study examined whether sadism could also appear prosocially, focusing on BDSM practitioners who inflict pain only with consent. Over 500 participants, including BDSM and non-BDSM individuals, completed surveys measuring everyday sadism under different consent conditions, along with empathy and personality traits. Results showed everyday sadism linked to lower empathy and agreeableness but higher dark triad traits, with psychopathy predicting sadism only in non-consent scenarios—suggesting most BDSM sadists are not everyday sadists, though those high in psychopathy might be.

A paper published in 2024 demonstrated that people high in everyday sadism blame victims more due to increased sadistic pleasure and reduced empathy. Across four studies (including an experience-sampling method with over 2,600 participants), this link persisted beyond personality traits (HEXACO and Dark Triad), cultural differences, and even among police officers who frequently encounter victim-perpetrator cases. Everyday sadism predicted less effortful processing of assault details and greater victim blaming in real-life situations, unaffected by victim closeness or incident severity.

=== Dark tetrad ===
The dark tetrad is the grouping of the dark triad personality traits narcissism, machiavellianism, psychopathy, with the addition of everyday sadism. Myrthe Meere and Vincent Egan note that subclinical sadism is seen in everyday settings, such as those who are attracted to violence on television or those who like to engage in combat sports. Studies on sadism show inverse correlations between perspective-taking and empathic concern. Due to its overlap with psychopathy, scholars have questioned its inclusion in the dark tetrad model. However, Johnson et al. stated that the results of their research "support sadism’s inclusion within the Dark Tetrad as a unique construct but with some conceptual overlap with psychopathy". Nevertheless, Christian Blötner and others believe that measures of subclinical sadism and psychopathy still have problems of redundancy.

== See also ==
- BDSM
- Cruelty
- Schadenfreude
- Sadomasochism
- Sadistic personality disorder
- Zoosadism
