= Cognitive appraisal =

Interpretation by an individual to stimuli

Cognitive appraisal (also called simply 'appraisal') is the subjective interpretation made by an individual to stimuli in the environment. It is a component in a variety of theories relating to stress, mental health, coping, and emotion. It is most notably used in the transactional model of stress and coping, introduced in a 1984 publication by Richard Lazarus and Susan Folkman. In this theory, cognitive appraisal is defined as the way in which an individual responds to and interprets stressors in life. A variety of mental disorders have been observed as having abnormal patterns of cognitive appraisal in those affected by the disorder. Other work has detailed how personality can influence the way in which individuals cognitively appraise a situation.

The reframing of stimuli and experiences, called cognitive reappraisal, has been found "one of the most effective strategies for emotion regulation."

== Conceptualizations and theories ==
Visual representation of Lazarus' transactional model of stress.

=== Lazarus' transactional model of stress ===
This model uses cognitive appraisal as a way to explain responses to stressful events.

According to this theory, two distinct forms of cognitive appraisal must occur in order for an individual to feel stress in response to an event; Lazarus called these stages "primary appraisal" and "secondary appraisal". During primary appraisal, an event is interpreted as dangerous to the individual or threatening to their personal goals. During the secondary appraisal, the individual evaluates their ability or resources to be able to cope with a specific situation.

=== Scherer's component process model ===
The component process model proposed by Klaus Scherer utilizes cognitive appraisal to explain an individual's psychological and physiological response to situations. Scherer's model makes additions to Lazarus’ transactional model regarding how many appraisals occur. Rather than just two levels of appraisal in response to an event (primary and secondary), Scherer's model suggests four distinct appraisals occur: (a) the direct effects or relevance that an individual perceives an event being to them (b) the consequences an event has both immediately and long-term to an individual and their goals (c) the ability an individual perceives they can cope with the consequences of an event (d) the ways in which the events are perceived to result from an individual's values and self-concept. This model and additional work by Scherer notably highlights not only psychological responses, but many physiological responses according to how events are appraised by an individual.

=== Roseman's appraisal theory of emotions ===
Ira Roseman utilized the concept of cognitive appraisal to build an explanatory theory that encompasses a wider range of emotions (when compared with Lazarus' transactional model). According to Roseman (1996), positive emotions result from events that an individual appraises as consistent with their motives, while negative emotions result from events that individuals appraise as inconsistent with their motives. More specific emotions are based on if the event is perceived to be as caused by others, the individual, or due to an uncontrollable circumstance.

== Evaluation of appraisal theories ==
There is varied experimental evidence that illustrates the properties of appraisal theories. A meta analysis found that 75% of studies showed statistically significant relationships between appraisal and emotions. This encapsulates the core of appraisal theories that interpretations of experiences is what gives rise to emotions.

The strength of the relationship between appraisal of circumstance and emotional state is exhibited by a discriminant analysis that showed patterns of cognitive appraisal were able to predict 40% of corresponding emotions. The study specifically used Roseman (1984) and Scherer's (1984) theories of emotions as basis of the analysis. Appraisal theories suggest mechanisms that detect personal relevance provoke emotion, and primary appraisal was identified as the main process connecting values and emotions.

There are few tools available that accurately measure cognitive appraisal based on its theoretical definition. Reliable and valid instruments are needed to better understand how cognitive appraisal affects mental and physical health in people under stress. Research shows that cognitive appraisal can influence mental health and can be changed. However, existing measures of how individuals assess stressful events often lack clear theoretical grounding and have weak psychometric support.

Other methodological issues come from uses of self-report questionnaires to measure effectiveness of appraisal. Self-report measures are criticized for their lack of validity due to their subjectivity to biases such as social desirability, lack of introspective ability and measurement error.

Neural measures of emotion provide more objectivity but are also difficult to interpret. Lab studies that measure amygdala activation or changes in neural networks to determine reappraisal effectiveness lack ecological validity as the experimental settings are artificial and not reflective of real life.

Theoretical assumptions of Lazarus' transactional model of stress have been empirically violated such as the assumption that individual emotions are specifically only related to one other core-relational theme. However, emotions were found to be significantly correlated to more than one appraisal component.

== Strategies ==
Cognitive reappraisal is one of the most studied mechanisms of the emotion regulation form referred to as cognitive change. It encompasses a variety of different strategies, such as positive reappraisal (creating and focusing on a positive aspect of the stimulus), decentering (reinterpreting an event by broadening one's perspective to see "the bigger picture"), or fictional reappraisal (adopting or emphasizing the belief that event is not real, that it is for instance "just a movie" or "just my imagination").

There are two main theoretical models for emotion regulation therapies, each based on different views of how the brain supports cognitive reappraisal. These are the top-down Cognitive Emotion Regulation (CER) model and the bottom-up Experiential-Dynamic Emotion Regulation (EDER) model.

The CER model, developed by Gross (1998), sees conscious thinking and appraisal as central to how emotions are produced and managed. It emphasizes the use of deliberate strategies, such as changing situations or thoughts, to reduce emotional intensity. This is known as a top-down approach, where higher brain functions guide emotional responses. These strategies work by activating the prefrontal cortex to inhibit emotional responses from areas like the amygdala. Effective regulation under this model requires a sense of safety and a stable environment. However, if emotions are intense or linked to real threats, the ability to use these strategies may be limited, and the brain must adapt quickly at a more automatic, local level.

The EDER model focuses on processing emotions directly, rather than controlling them. This approach encourages individuals to experience and understand their emotions by paying attention to bodily sensations and internal states. It operates from the bottom-up, starting with emotional experiences and allows natural regulation to occur. Emotions are seen as arising automatically from brain systems, and regulation happens through self-correcting biological processes. Emotional problems arise when this natural regulation is disrupted. Therapies using the EDER model aim to restore this natural process by helping individuals become aware of and process their emotions. This approach is less reliant on conscious thought and language and is rooted in brain regions associated with automatic and emotional functions, particularly on the right and subcortical areas.

Cognitive reappraisal can be used in many ways. Using an understanding of arousal congruency, individuals can reappraise anxious arousal into excitement by using reappraisal strategies like self-talk (e.g. repeating “I will be excited” verbally).

Cognitive reappraisal can help boost creativity and cognitive flexibility, especially for individuals with low openness to experience as eliciting emotional events require considering new perspectives. Cognitive reappraisal mediates relationships of creative self-efficacy with positive affect and career satisfaction.

Reappraisal is effective in improving wellbeing rather than reducing mental health symptoms, and is most beneficial to individuals with vulnerabilities such as neuroticism and high stress levels.

== Practical applications ==
The way in which stress is cognitively appraised has been found to influence mental health. Cognitive styles of perceiving the world and interpreting events have been suggested as factors that may make certain individuals more prone to depression, such as Aaron Beck's cognitive theory (1967). A variety of studies have linked panic disorder with attentional biases and catastrophization.

Cognitive appraisal is often used to help with coping in stressful situations. The technique is often used in cognitive behavioral therapy as it encourages individuals to identify their irrational beliefs and reconstruct their belief system to decrease negative thoughts and behaviors. It has helped clients recognize and correct maladaptive thoughts. Active forms of emotional coping like positive reframing and humor have benefits in reducing stress.
