= Mischievous responders =

Concept in survey design

Mischievous responders are individuals—typically youth—who jokingly provide dishonest and extreme answers to survey questions. The impact of mischievous responders on data related to disparities between heterosexual and sexual minority youth has been noted, with studies finding that mischievous responders distort data to overestimate disparities. These distortions of data can sometimes lead to inaccuracies that "substantively affect research, policy, and public discourse regarding a variety of disparities". A 2019 pre-registered study found data from mischievous responders to account for the entirety of numerous apparent disparities between heterosexuals and sexual minorities, including in heroin use and drunk driving. Mischievous responders are more often boys than girls, and tend to falsely report being lesbian, gay, bisexual or queer. A 2006 study found that 99% of young respondents who'd claimed in a survey to have used an artificial limb were lying, as determined in follow-up interviews. Research suggests that mischievous responders are "ubiquitous in adolescent research using self-administered questionnaires". Methods for identifying and accounting for data from mischievous responders include the use of boosted regressions, and some surveys include questions with impossible answers to catch dishonest respondents. Others simply ask respondents if they had been honest. The term "mischievous responders" was coined in 2011 by Joseph P. Robinson-Cimpian.
