= Marlowe–Crowne Social Desirability Scale =

- Purpose: measure social desirability bias

The Marlowe–Crowne Social Desirability Scale (MC–SDS) is a 33-item self-report questionnaire that assesses whether or not respondents are concerned with social approval. The scale was created by Douglas P. Crowne and David Marlowe in 1960 in an effort to measure social desirability bias, which is considered one of the most common biases affecting survey research. The MC–SDS has been cited or referenced in more than 5,000 scholarly articles and dissertations. The MC-SDS is one of the earliest scales measuring socially desirable responding, with more contemporary scales often used in forensic psychological assessments, such as the Paulus Deception Scale or the Balanced Inventory of Desirable Responding (BIDR)

== History ==
The scale consists of 33 items which were defined to be culturally acceptable but unlikely to occur, and also to have minimal abnormal implications for either the socially desirable or socially undesirable responses. Faculty members and graduate students of Ohio State University's Department of Psychology scored 50 items as either socially desirable or socially undesirable; those 47 items which had at least 90% agreement became the initial form of the MC–SDS. Of the 47 items, the 33 which discriminated between high and low scores at the .05 level became the MC–SDS. In 1964, Crowne and Marlowe published The Approval Motive: Studies in Evaluative Dependence, which details their explorations with the MC–SDS.

== Interpretation ==
A high number of socially desirable responses might indicate that the respondent is generally concerned with social approval and conforming to societal conventions, while a low score might indicate that the respondent is less concerned with such things and is more willing to answer survey questions truthfully and representing themselves accurately.

However, Crowne noted that the motive to answer in socially desirable ways is more than a simple need for approval, it also entails a repressive defense against a vulnerable self-esteem.

== Applications ==
A study using the MC–SDS determined that social desirability has a significant impact on responses to questions involving drug, alcohol, and psychiatric problems.

HIV studies use self-reported surveys to gather data about sexual knowledge and practices, therefore this data is vulnerable to social desirability bias; a study done in Ethiopia, Kenya, Mozambique, and Uganda, concluded that the MC–SDS can be implemented in Sub-Saharan Africa and that its implementation could be helpful in gathering data in HIV-related surveys.

A study involving social desirability in adult male sexual offenders concluded with results that supported the use of the MC–SDS to determine how much sexual offenders are answering questions in a socially desirable way.

Various studies have found significant relationships between the MC–SDS and attitude change, consumer satisfaction, dyadic interactions, innovativeness, and risk-taking.

== Criticism ==
The social desirability scale itself lives on in part because investigators misconstrue a socially desirable response style and what it expresses.

— Douglas P. Crowne,

Researchers believe that identifying MC–SDS respondents with a high number of socially desirability responses will 'decontaminate' research on personality variables. Crowne believes that social desirability is a personality variable in and of itself and that one can not strip away a research participant's self-evaluation style to 'find the real person underneath.' Crowne also noted that removing participants from studies because of their overly favorable self-assessment will only bias those studies' samples.

== See also ==
- Social desirability bias
