= Klaus Scherer =

Swiss social psychologist

Klaus Rainer Scherer (born 1943) is professor emeritus of psychology and director of the Swiss Center for Affective Sciences in Geneva. He is a specialist in the psychology of emotion. He is known for editing the Handbook of Affective Sciences and several other influential articles on emotions, expression, personality and music.

He is also a founding editor of the APA journal Emotion.

== Education ==
Scherer received a PhD from Harvard University in 1970.

In 1990 he was elected a member of the Academia Europaea.

== The Component Process Model ==
The Component Process Model (CPM) is Scherer's major theory of emotions. It regards emotions as the synchronisation of many different cognitive and physiological components. Emotions are identified with the overall process whereby low level cognitive appraisals, in particular the processing of relevance, trigger bodily reactions, behaviours and subjective feelings.

== Major publications ==
=== Research monographs and books ===
- Nonverbale Kommunikation. (1970): Buske.
- Human Aggression and Conflict. (1972) Prentice Hall (transl. German, Italian).
- Die Streßreaktion (1985) Hogrefe.
- Experiencing emotion. (1986) Cambridge UP.
- Facets of emotion. (1988). Erlbaum.

=== Edited or co-edited books ===
- Nonverbale Kommunikation (1979). Beltz.
- Social markers in speech (1979). Cambridge UP.
- Handbook of methods in nonverbal behavior research. (1982). Cambridge UP.
- Vokale Kommunikation (1982). Beltz.
- Advances in the social psychology of language. (1982). Cambridge UP.
- Approaches to emotion (1984) Erlbaum.
- Psychobiologie (1987) dtv.
- Psychobiologie (1988) Fischer.
- Les émotions (1989) Delachaux & Niestlé.
- Enzyklopädie der Psychologie. Psychologie der Emotion (1990) Hogrefe.
- Justice: An interdisciplinary perspective (1992) Cambridge UP.
- Appraisal processes in emotion: Theory, Methods, Research (2001). Oxford UP.
- Handbook of Affective Sciences (2003). Oxford UP.
- The New Handbook of Methods in Nonverbal Behavior Research (2005) Oxford UP.

=== Book chapters ===
- Scherer, K. R. (1999). Appraisal theories. In T. Dalgleish, & M. Power (Eds.). Handbook of Cognition and Emotion (pp. 637–663). Chichester: Wiley.
- Scherer, K. R. (2000). Emotions as episodes of subsystem synchronization driven by nonlinear appraisal processes. In M. D. Lewis & I. Granic (Eds.) Emotion, development, and self-organization: Dynamic systems approaches to emotional development (pp. 70–99). New York/Cambridge: Cambridge University Press.
- Scherer, K. R. (2000). Psychological models of emotion. In J. Borod (Ed.). The neuropsychology of emotion (pp. 137–162). Oxford/New York: Oxford University Press.
- Scherer, K. R. (2001). Appraisal considered as a process of multi-level sequential checking. In K. R. Scherer, A. Schorr, & T. Johnstone (Eds.). Appraisal processes in emotion: Theory, Methods, Research (pp. 92–120). New York and Oxford: Oxford University Press.
- Scherer, K. R. & Zentner, K. R. (2001). Emotional effects of music: production rules. In P. N. Juslin & J. A. Sloboda (Eds). Music and emotion: Theory and research (pp. 361–392). Oxford: Oxford University Press.
- Scherer, K. R. & Peper, M. (2001). Psychological theories of emotion and neuropsychological research (). In F. Boller & J. Grafman (Eds.). Handbook of Neuropsychology. Vol. 5 (Emotional behavior and its disorders, ed. G. Gainotti, pp. 17–48). Amsterdam: Elsevier.
- Scherer, K. R., Johnstone, T. & Klasmeyer, G. (2003). Vocal expression of emotion. In R. J. Davidson, K. R. Scherer, H. Goldsmith (Eds.). Handbook of the Affective Sciences (pp. 433–456). New York and Oxford: Oxford University Press.
- Scherer, K. R. (2004). Feelings integrate the central representation of appraisal-driven response organization in emotion. In A. S. R. Manstead, N. H. Frijda, & A. H. Fischer (Eds.). Feelings and Emotions: The Amsterdam Symposium (pp. 136–157). Cambridge, Cambridge University Press.
- Juslin, P.N. and Scherer, K.R. (2005). Vocal expression of affect. In J. Harrigan, R. Rosenthal, & K. Scherer, (Eds.). The New Handbook of Methods in Nonverbal Behavior Research (pp. 65–135). Oxford University Press, Oxford, UK.
- Scherer, K. R. (2007). Component Models of Emotion Can Inform the Quest for Emotional Competence. In G . Matthews, M. Zeidner, and R. D. Roberts (Eds.), The Science of Emotional Intelligence: Knowns and Unknowns. (pp. 101–126). New York: Oxford University Press.

=== Most frequently cited journal articles 1980–2003 ===
Listed in order of frequency of citation

- Scherer, K. R. (1986). Vocal affect expression: A review and a model for future research. Psychological Bulletin, 99, 143–165.
- Asendorpf, J. B., & Scherer, K. R. (1983). The Discrepant Repressor – Journal of Personality and Social Psychology, 45(6), 1334–1346.
- Banse, R., & Scherer, K. R. (1996). Acoustic profiles in vocal emotion expression. Journal of Personality and Social Psychology, 70(3), 614–636.
- Scherer, K. R., & Wallbott, H. G. (1994). Evidence for Universality and Cultural Variation of Differential Emotion Response Patterning. Journal of Personality and Social Psychology 66(2), 310–328.
- Scherer, K. R. (1993). Neuroscience Projections. Cognition and Emotion, 7(1), 1–41.
- Scherer, K. R. (1993). Studying the Emotion-Antecedent Appraisal Process. Cognition and Emotion, 7(3–4), 325–355.
- Ladd, D. R., et al. (1985). Evidence for the Independent Function of Intonation Contour Type, Voice Quality, and F0 Range in Signaling Speaker Affect. Journal of the Acoustical Society of America, 78(2), 435–444.
- Scherer, K. R. (1997). The role of culture in emotion-antecedent appraisal. Journal of Personality and Social Psychology, 73(5), 902–922.
- Scherer, K. R. (1978). Personality Inference from Voice Quality. European Journal of Social Psychology, 8(4), 467–487.
- Scherer, K. R. (1997). Profiles of emotion-antecedent appraisal:. Cognition and Emotion, 11(2), 113–150.
- Wallbott, H. G., & Scherer, K. R. (1986). Cues and Channels in Emotion Recognition. Journal of Personality and Social Psychology, 51(4), 690–699.
- Scherer, K. R., et al. (1991). Vocal Cues in Emotion Encoding and Decoding. Motivation and Emotion, 15(2), 123–148.
- Mikula, G., et al. (1998). The role of injustice in the elicitation of differential emotional reactions. Personality and Social Psychology Bulletin, 24(7), 769–783.
- Scherer, K. R. (2003). Vocal communication of emotion, Speech and Communication, 40(1–2), 227–256.
- Scherer, K. R., et al. (1973). Voice of Confidence – Journal of Research in Personality, 7(1), 31–44.
- Scherer, K. R., et al. (1984). Vocal Cues to Speaker Affect . Journal of the Acoustical Society of America., 76(5), 1346–1356.
- Scherer, K. R., & Tannenbaum, P. H. (1986). Emotional Experiences in Everyday Life. Motivation and Emotion, 10(4), 295–314.
- Scherer, K. R., et al. (2001). Emotion inferences from vocal expression correlate across languages and cultures. Journal of Cross-Cultural Psychology, 32(1), 76–92.
- Scherer, K. R. (1985). Vocal Affect Signaling. Advanced Study of Behaviour, 15, 189–244.
- Scherer, K. R. (1995). Expression of Emotion in Voice and Music. Journal of Voice, 9(3), 235–248.
- Tolkmitt, F. J., & Scherer, K. R. (1986). Effect of Experimentally Induced Stress on Vocal Parameters. Journal of Experimental Psychology and Human Perceptual Performance, 12(3), 302–313.
- Wehrle, T., et al. (2000). Studying the dynamics of emotional expression using synthesized facial muscle movements. Journal of Personality and Social Psychology., 78(1), 105–119.

=== Major articles since 2004 ===
- Scherer, K. R., et al. (2004). Beyond Surprise. Emotion, 4(4), 389–402.
- van Reekum, C., et al. (2004). Psychophysiological responses to appraisal responses in a computer game. Cognition and Emotion, 18(5), 663–688.
- Scherer, K. R. (2004). Which emotions can be induced by music? Journal of New Music Research, 33(3), 239–251.
- Johnstone, T., et al. (2005). Affective speech elicited with a computer game. Emotion, 5(4), 513–518.
- Scherer, K. R. (2005). "What are emotions? And how can they be measured?". Social Science Information., 44(4), 693–727.
- Sander, D., et al. (2005). A systems approach to appraisal mechanisms in emotion. Neural Networks., 18, 317–352.
- Bänziger, T. & Scherer, K. R. (2005). The role of intonation in emotional expressions. Speech and Communication., 46, 252–267.
- Grandjean, D., et al. (2005). The Voices of Wrath:, Nature Neuroscience., 8(2), 145–146.
- Sander, D., et al. (2005). Emotion and Attention Interactions in Social Cognition: NeuroImage, 28(4), 848–58.
- Scherer, K. R., et al. (2006). What determines a feeling's position in three-dimensional affect space? Cognition . Emotion, 20(1), 92–113.
- Grandjean, D., et al. (2006). Intonation as an interface between language and affect. Progress in Brain Research, 156, 235–247.
- Scherer, K. R.&, Ellgring, H. (2007). Multimodal Expression of Emotion. Emotion, 7(1), 158–171.
- Scherer, K. R.&, Ellgring, H. (2007). Are facial expressions of emotion produced by categorical affect programs or dynamically driven by appraisal?. Emotion, 7(1,) 113–130.
- Aue, T., et al. (2007). First evidence for differential and sequential efferent effects of goal relevance and goal conduciveness appraisal. Biological Psychology., 74, 347–357.
- Brosch, T., et al. (2007). That baby caught my eye.. Attention capture by infant faces. Emotion, 7(3), 685–689.
- Fontaine, J. et al. (2007). The world of emotions is not two-dimensional. Psychological Science, 18(12), 1050–1057.

== See also ==
- Cognitive Appraisal
- Appraisal theory
