= Core relational theme =

A core relational theme is the central or core meaning associated with a certain emotion. Core relational themes were introduced by Richard Lazarus, based on his appraisal approach to understanding emotion.

== Appraisal theory ==
Appraisal theory examines the situational factors that produce emotional reactions. According to the appraisal approach of emotion, in order to understand a certain emotion, it is necessary to understand the relational meaning that has induced it, and how that meaning was formed. Emotions are reactions to the fate of active goals in everyday life and are driven by cognitive events. Events can pertain to a variety of cognitive concepts, such as, important ideas, moral values, issues with the self and identity, social esteem, or other people and their well-being. The relationship between specific cognitions and individual emotions has stimulated a wide body of research on appraisal and emotion

== Richard S. Lazarus ==
Richard S. Lazarus emphasizes the relationship between the person and the environment as important contributing factors in emotion and adaptation. According to Lazarus, the person-environment relationship is the arena of the emotions and the adaptational encounter is the basis for analysis. Lazarus also emphasizes the important role of motivation in a person's appraisal of a certain event as consisting of harms or benefits, real or imagined. Lazarus identifies four important implications that we can learn from observing emotional reactions in others in connection to the appraisal process.

First, the quality and intensity of a certain emotion can inform us about ongoing relationships between persons and their environments, which Lazarus calls, “core relational themes.”

Second, emotions can tell us about what is or is not important to an individual in a certain encounter because we are not emotionally moved by unimportant events.

Third, we can discover a great deal about a person's beliefs about the self and the world by observing how a person appraises relationships with the environments and the emotions that this results in.

Fourth, an emotion can show us how a person has appraised or evaluated an event in relation to its significance for personal well-being.

Lazarus defines appraisal theory of emotion as having two basic themes:

“First, emotion is a response to evaluative judgments or meaning; second, these judgments are about ongoing relationships with the environment, namely how one is doing in the agenda of living and whether the encounter of the environment is one of harm of benefit.”

According to Lazarus, the appraisal process involves a set of decision-making components, which create evaluative patterns that differ among each of the emotions. Lazarus proposed two stages to the appraisal process: the primary appraisal stage and the secondary appraisal stage. There are three primary components and three secondary components that combine in different ways to represent each emotion.

== Primary appraisal ==
The three components of primary appraisal are goal relevance, goal congruence, and type of ego-involvement. In the primary appraisal stage, an individual first evaluates an event in terms of personal goal relevance If an event is deemed relevant to an individual's personal goals, an emotion is generated; if not, an emotion will not ensue. Then the individual appraises ongoing events to the extent that the event is congruent or incongruent with the individual's goals. If the goal is congruent, the consequent event will be evaluated as positive. If the goal is incongruent, then negative emotions will be elicited. The specific emotion experienced by the individual depends on the secondary appraisal(s) linked to the primary appraisal

== Secondary appraisal ==
The secondary appraisal stage deals with coping options in which the individual considers a causal attribution for the event, ways to respond, and future consequences of different plans of action. The three components of secondary appraisal are accountability (blame or credit), coping potential (problem-focused or emotion-focused), and future expectations.

Lazarus termed the result of these combined processes as the core relational themes of the emotion.

== Core relational themes of emotion ==
A core relational theme provides a convenient summary for the relational harm or benefit that underlies each specific kind of emotion. Each emotion or emotion family is defined by a core relational theme. When the implications for individual well-being are appraised by a person, an action impulse, that is consistent with the core relational theme and the emotion that flows from it, is produced.

Emotion	Core Relational Theme
Anger	a demeaning offense against me and mine
Anxiety	facing uncertain, existential threat
Fright	facing an immediate, concrete, and overwhelming physical danger
Guilt	having transgressed a moral imperative
Shame	having failed to live up to an ego-ideal
Sadness	having experienced an irrevocable loss
Envy	wanting what someone else has
Jealousy	resenting a third party for loss or threat to another's affection
Disgust	taking in or being too close to an indigestible object or idea
Happiness	making reasonable progress toward to realization of a goal
Pride	enhancement of one's ego-identity by taking credit for a valued object or achievement, either our own or that of someone or group with whom we identify
Relief	a distressing goal-incongruent condition that has changed for the better or gone away
Hope	fearing the worst but yearning for the better
Love	desiring or participating in affection, usually but not necessarily reciprocated
Compassion	being moved by another's suffering and wanting to help

Lazarus (1991)

== Appraisals for anger ==
Primary Appraisal Components

1. If there is goal relevance, then any emotion is possible, including anger. If not, no emotion.

2. If there is goal incongruence, then only negative emotions are possible, including anger.

3. If the type of ego-involvement engaged is to preserve or enhance the self-or social-esteem aspect of one's ego-identity, then the emotion possibilities include anger, anxiety, and pride.

Secondary Appraisal Components

4. If there is blame, which derives from the knowledge that someone is accountable for the harmful actions, and they could have been controlled, then anger occurs. If the blame is to another, then anger is directed externally; if to oneself, the anger is directed internally.

5. If coping potential favors attack as viable, then anger is facilitated.

6. If future expectancy is positive about the environmental response to attack, then anger is facilitated.

Appraisal components sufficient and necessary for anger are 1 through 4

== Appraisals for love ==
Primary Appraisal Components

1. If there is goal relevance, then any emotion is possible, including love.

2. If there is goal congruence, then only positive emotions are possible, including love.

3. If the type of ego-involvement is desire for mutual appreciation, which is affirming to our ego-identity, then the emotion possibilities narrow to love (or at least liking); if to this is added sexual interest or passion, then love is romantic rather than companionate.

No secondary appraisal components are involved, except perhaps future expectation, which when positive favors love but when negative (that is, the other does not reciprocate) prevents or undermines love.

Appraisal components sufficient and necessary for love are 1, 2, and 3.

Appraisals are not the same for companionate and romantic love except for the role of sexual passion, though it can be absent in romantic love, for one reason or another'
