= Response style =

Response style may refer to:

- The style of responses to questionnaires and surveys. See Response bias
- Psychological responses to stress according to Response Styles Theory. See Rumination (psychology)
