= Mapa ng Loob =

The Mapa ng Loob [ˈmapa naŋ lɔʔˈɔb], or Masaklaw na Panukat ng Loob [ˈmasak'law na pa'nukat naŋ lɔʔˈɔb] (English: Comprehensive Measure of Personality) is a 188-item Filipino self-report personality inventory. It has a five-factor structure made up of 20 scales, which results in 4 scales for each of the five factors or domains (Neuroticism, Extraversion, Openness, Agreeableness, and Conscientiousness). It has two additional scales which belong to two domains, and one social desirability scale. As with similar instruments such as the NEO-PI and the HEXACO, an individual can be scored on each of the 5 larger domains, but also on each of the more specific trait scales.

The Mapa was developed by academics and students working at the University of the Philippines Diliman, for use with young adult and adult Filipino respondents.

== History and development ==
Previous work in the Philippines have already established that Five Factor or Big 5 traits can be recovered from indigenous personality inventories. However, until the Mapa, there had been no serious attempt at constructing a Filipino instrument with a clear five factor structure.

Plans for what eventually became the Mapa originally intended it to be an update of the existing personality inventory Panukat ng Pagkataong Pilipino (PPP). Eventually it was decided instead that it will become a separate instrument. The lead author, Professor Gregorio E. H. del Pilar of the University of the Philippines Diliman, has also cited the need for up-to-date and affordable psychological instruments in the Philippines as one of the motivations behind the development of the Mapa.

Initial work on item writing was undertaken at the University of the Philippines Diliman, during the second semester of 2010 (equivalent to the fall semester) by a team of 6 graduate students and by groups taking a course on psychological measurement, all of whom were supervised by del Pilar. This produced a pool of items which were then examined and rated for prototypicality. Items deemed to be suitable were subjected to empirical testing. Six rounds of revisions, using mainly reliability analysis, and factor analysis, were conducted over 2 1/2 years, with samples coming from different parts of the Philippines. The final version of the Mapa was completed around the middle of 2013, when a clear five factor structure was achieved.

== Scales ==
Scale	Scale name in English	Origin of scale	Big 5 domain
N1 Hina ng Loob	Vulnerability to Stress	Originally from PPP Pagkamahinahon	Neuroticism
N2 Pagkamaramdamin	Oversensitiveness	PPP	Neuroticism
N3 Pagkamapag-alala	Worrying Anxiety	New	Neuroticism
N4 Pagkasumpungin	Moodiness	New	Neuroticism
E1 Pagkamasayahin	Cheerfulness	PPP	Extraversion
E2 Pagkapalakaibigan	Friendliness	PPP	Extraversion
E3 Pagkamasigla	Energy	New	Extraversion
E4 Pagkamadaldal	Loquiaciousness	New	Extraversion
O1 Kakaibang Pag-iisip	Original Thinking	Originally from PPP Pagkamalikhain	Openness
O2 Hilig sa Bagong Kaalaman	Intellectual Curiosity	New	Openness
O3 Pagkamakasining	Aesthetic Sensitivity	New	Openness
O4 Pagkamaharaya	Imaginativeness	New	Openness
A1 Pagkadimayabang	Modesty	Originally from PPP Pagkamapagkumbaba	Agreeableness
A2 Pagkamapagtiwala	Capacity for Trust	New	Agreeableness
A3 Pagkamaunawain	Capacity for Understanding	PPP	Agreeableness
A4 Pagkamapagparaya	Obligingness	New	Agreeableness
C1 Pagkamasikap	Achievement-striving	PPP	Conscientiousness
C2 Pagkamapagplano	Planfulness	Originally from PPP Pagkamaayos	Conscientiousness
C3 Pagkaresponsable	Responsibleness	PPP	Conscientiousness
C4 Pagkamaingat	Carefulness	New	Conscientiousness

== Research using the Mapa ==
Cagasan, one of the authors of the Mapa, published an article in 2016 where he used the Mapa to explore social desirability in a sample of 157 undergraduate students in the Philippines. As expected, he found that people who scored higher on social desirability tended to score higher on Agreeableness and Conscientiousness, and lower on Neuroticism, when rating themselves compared to when they were being rated by peers.

A study published in 2013 investigated the relationships between self-reported personality traits and experience with local political leadership. The study participants were 133 local political officials in the town of Rosario, in Cavite province in the Philippines, and 143 residents in the same town who had no previous experience in political leadership. It made use of 7 scales from the version of the Mapa available at that time, namely Pagkapalakaibigan (Friendliness), Pagkamasigla (Energy), Pagkadi-mayabang (Modesty), Pagkamaunawain (Capacity for Understanding), Pagkamasikap (Achievement-striving), Pagkaresponsable (Responsibleness), and Pagkamaayos (Orderliness, a scale later superseded in the final version of the Mapa in favor of Pakamapagplano, or Planfulness). It was found that local leaders tended to score lower on the Modesty and Orderliness scales of the Mapa, and higher on Friendliness compared to non-leaders.

Research published in 2016 looked into the possible protective role of gratitude against anhedonic depression. In this study, the author used an abridged version of an English translation of the Mapa Neuroticism domain scale to control for the role of personality. Using data from 477 Filipino undergraduates, it was found that Neuroticism predicted anhedonic depression, but also that this relationship disappeared when positive and negative affect were included in the analysis.
