= BIDR =

BIDR may refer to:

- Balanced Inventory of Desirable Responding, a psychometric tool that serves as a 40-item self-report questionnaire
- Bidar railway station, Karnataka, India, by Indian Railways station code
- Jacob Blaustein Institutes for Desert Research, a research institute in Ben-Gurion University of the Negev, Israel
