= Susan Folkman =

American psychologist

- Born: March 19, 1938 (age 88); New York City, US
- Spouse: David H. Folkman (m. 1958)

Academic background
- Education: Brandeis University; University of Missouri; University of California, Berkeley
- Thesis: An Analysis of Coping in a Middle-Aged Community Sample (1980)

Academic work
- Institutions: University of California, Berkeley; University of California, San Francisco; UCSF School of Medicine
- Notable works: Stress, Appraisal and Coping (1984)

Susan Kleppner Folkman (born March 19, 1938) is an American psychologist, author, and emerita professor of medicine at the University of California at San Francisco (UCSF). She is internationally recognized for her contributions to the field of psychological stress and coping. Her 1984 book Stress, Appraisal and Coping alongside Richard Lazarus, is the most widely cited academic book in its field, and the 17th most cited book in social science.

== Early life and education ==
Susan Kleppner was born on March 19, 1938, in New York City, New York, to parents Beatrice and Otto Kleppner. She received a Bachelor of Arts in history from Brandeis University (1959), an M.Ed. in counseling psychology from the University of Missouri, St. Louis (1974), and a Ph.D. in educational psychology at the University of California, Berkeley (1979). She married David Folkman in 1958 and, after a hiatus of 12 years in which she was at home with their four children, she enrolled in an M.Ed. program in counseling psychology in 1972 at the University of Missouri, St. Louis, completing it in 1974. She was about to enter the PhD program at Washington University in St. Louis when her husband was offered a position in California. The family moved to the Bay Area and Folkman entered the doctoral program in educational psychology at the University of California, Berkeley. She received her PhD in 1979.

== Career ==
Folkman worked with Richard Lazarus and his stress and coping research group while studying for her PhD. In her work with this group, Folkman coined the terms "emotion-focused coping" and "problem-focused coping" as part of her doctoral thesis. Together with Lazarus she co-authored the 1984 book Stress, Appraisal and Coping, which worked through the theory of psychological stress using concepts of cognitive appraisal and coping.

After receiving her PhD, Folkman conducted community-based research with Lazarus until 1987 when Thomas J. Coates, director of the recently funded Center for AIDS Prevention Studies at the University of California, San Francisco, invited Folkman to develop a research program focusing on stress and HIV/AIDS. Folkman moved to UCSF, and in 1989, at the height of the AIDS epidemic, secured funding from the National Institutes of Health for a longitudinal study of stress and coping among the caregiving partners of men with HIV/AIDS. In 1997, she was awarded an honorary doctorate by Utrecht University for her contributions to the literature on stress and coping.

In 2001, Folkman was appointed as the first full-time director of UCSF's Osher Center for Integrative Medicine and named the Osher Foundation Distinguished Professor of Integrative Medicine. In 2006, Folkman was appointed chair of the Consortium of Academic Health Centers for Integrative Medicine and the North American Research Conference on Complementary and Integrative Medicine and the North American Research Conference on Complementary and Integrative Medicine.

She was elected to the National Advisory Councils of the National Institute of Mental Health (2000-2004) and the Center for Complementary and Alternative Medicine. Upon Folkman's retirement in 2009, she was named a professor emerita in UCSF's Department of Medicine. Margaret A. Chesney succeeded Folkman as director of the Osher Center for Integrative Medicine.
