= Balanced Inventory of Desirable Responding =

Psychometric questionnaire

The Balanced Inventory of Desirable Responding (BIDR) is a psychometric tool that serves as a 40-item self-report questionnaire. BIDR assesses the potential social desirability bias in respondents' answers and further shows the composition of impression management (IM) and self-deception enhancement (SDE) within that bias.

BIDR was developed by Paulhus in 1988 based on his Two-Component Model of social desirability, with the aim of addressing the dispute regarding whether social desirability should be controlled in research. This work primarily served as a summary of research findings at the time on social desirability in psychometrics . Specifically, the existence of the two factors was proved by statistical factor regression analysis of a large number of preliminary studies, and the conceptualization of the two factors was based on experimental verification of multiple hypotheses from various fields of psychology. BIDR updated the measurement of social desirability from a one-dimensional measurement of behavior to a measurement of a composite concept that includes both 'substantive' and 'stylistic' component, and further advocated caution in controlling social desirability bias under different situations.

BIDR has been applied in various scenarios since its establishment. Several studies suggested that BIDR is the first choice for measuring social desirability. However, BIDR has limitations in terms of convenience and item size. In current practice, the primary tool for measuring social desirability is still the Marlowe–Crowne Social Desirability Scale(MC-SDS).

== History ==
The early work of BIDR reviewed psychological studies around social desirability during that time and integrated insights from various other psychological fields including psychoanalysis, personality psychology, cognitive psychology, and statistical psychology. With the theoretical updates of social desirability, BIDR advocated for a balanced measurement of SDE and IM content to predict social desirability. This approach enables BIDR to demonstrate better adaptability in predicting the respondents' social desirability in different situations. BIDR also requires the evaluator to handle the results more cautiously. In the dispute over controlling social desirability, BIDR offered a moderate perspective, which to some extent alleviated the controversy at the time.

=== Social desirability bias in psychometrics ===
In psychometrics, social desirability bias represents response biases that are triggered by social cues. The concept of social desirability in psychometrics can be traced back to Bernreuter's research published in 1933. Edwards introduced this concept formally into psychometrics during 1953-1957 and developed the Minnesota Multiphasic Personality Inventory (MMPI)-L to control possible social desirability in self-report. Social desirability has then always been an important topic in psychometrics, as psychometricians believed that it could seriously undermine the validity of results.

=== The Stylistic vs. Substantive Debate ===
Early psychologists primarily viewed social desirability as an instrumental behavior serving a purpose in social circumstances. Based on this perspective, psychologists agreed to remove the content distorted by social desirability from self-reports to protect the validity of self-report results. Some pathological cases at that time reported unintentional social role-playing behavior, which indicated a connection between social desirability and personality. Earlier research suggested that social desirability was substantially more substantive than stylistic in the non-pathological field.

Hogan's work in Socioanalytic Theory offered a perspective that emphasizes the stylistic content of social desirability. This perspective posited that social desirability originates beneath the self-images and is driven by an unconscious process, indicating that social desirability may not always involve conscious fraudulent behavior. Meanwhile, research from the field of personality psychology reported that social desirability was highly correlated with a range of prosocial personality traits, including agreeableness, conscientiousness, and self-esteem, and negatively correlated with the Beck Depression Inventory. A serious problem emerged as psychologists questioned whether existing social desirability scales were actually filtering out liars or filtering out venerable people. Psychometricians began to argue about whether they should develop psychometric tools aim at strictly controlling social desirability.

Psychometricians with differing viewpoints used different methodologies to develop psychometric tools for social desirability bias. Those tools often showed minimal correlations with each other. Additionally, some psychometric tools of other fields reported a great loss of their predictive effect after controlling social desirability. Some psychologists suggested that these problems indicated a systematic problem between the objects that social desirability scale aimed to capture and the dimensions contained within social desirability. Psychologists began to try to further explore the dimensions of social desirability.

=== Two factors of social desirability ===
The Alpha and Gamma factors, two distinct factors that measure different content of social desirability were found in some comprehensive review study of social desirability. Scales that could be highly loaded onto the Alpha factor include Edward's Social Desirability Scale(SDS) and Ullmann's MMPI, while scales highly loaded onto the Gamma factor include Wiggins' SDS and the MMPI-K. After the two factors was discovered, Damarin and Messick proposed the Two-Component Theory of social desirability and advocated conceptualising of the two factors.

The two factors were conceptualized as attribution and denial in early conceptualization. The attribution represented attributing the desirable qualities desired by society to self, while denial represented rejecting attributing undesirable concepts to self. However, a study showed that the intercorrelation of MC-SDS subscale that conceptualized two factors based on attribution and denial was significantly lower than that of MC-SDS. Millham himself also found that the significant differences in the performance of Alpha and Gamma factors under the Bogus Pipeline Condition could not be well loaded onto attribution and denial.

Paulhus organized the conceptual research at the time and pointed out that self-deception and IM were most suitable as the conceptual basis for the two factors. The final version of BIDR identified two components of social desirability as the personality structure (i.e., stylistic content) SDE and the behavioral substrate structure (i.e., substantive content) IM, and suggested that both parts jointly predicted the overall behavior of social desirability. This joint effect (i.e., the Balance) was one of the guiding principles in the development of BIDR.

The Dimension of Social Desirability in BIDR

=== Impression Management and Self-Deception ===
Impression management (IM) in social desirability research was mainly characterised by the manipulation of others' perceptions in social environments, and it was generally considered that IM should be controlled as a contaminating factor in self-reporting. The measurement of IM can be traced back to Ruch's (1941) Honesty Scale. The development of IM psychometric tools primarily involved the measurement of two types of IM: strategic IM (i.e., for achieving a certain goal) and motivational IM (i.e., for maintaining a positive self-image). The former includes MMPI-Lie, Eysenck Personality Questionnaire-Lie and 16PF-Lie. The latter includes MC-Need for Approval scale and Self-Monitoring Scale.

Self-deception (SD) in social desirability research is characterised by the maintenance of one's self-image, and there has been debate over whether SD should be controlled in self-report. The earliest measurement of SD can be traced back to Frenkel-Brunswik's research in 1939. In a study on autistic traits conducted by Cattell, a highly self-enhancing characteristic was discovered, which was highly confused with self-deception. Gur and Sackeim took a definitive step in clarifying the definition of Self-deception from a psycho-philosophical and psychoanalytic perspective, and developed the Self-Deception Questionnaire (SDQ) and Other-Deception Questionnaire (ODQ), which provided valuable contributions in the development of BIDR.

Paulhus tested self-deception denial (SDD) and self-deception enhancement (SDE) based on Gur & Sackeim (1979)'s work. SDD represents denying the attributes that do not meet social desired, while self-deception enhancement represents emphasizing the assets that meet social expectations. The results showed that the content of SDE measurement was independent of other content, while the content of SDD largely overlapping with IM to a great extent.

=== Development of items in BIDR ===
The main items of the SDE section of BIDR were made through the conceptual reversal of items in SDQ, and avoided the use of negative vocabulary. Due to the differences between SDE and SDD trait that had been previously validated, Paulhus suggested that the threatening items in SDQ (e.g., 'Are you enjoying your bowel movements?') involved stimulating individuals' defenses from a psychoanalytic perspective, which was inconsistent with the concept of SDE. Therefore, the SDE section of BIDR used positive language overall. The main contents aimed to be capture in SDE section were as follows:

(i) Self-serving bias in the face of failure.

(ii) Control illusion.

(iii) Excessive memory confidence.

(iv) Familiarity claims for non-existent things.

The items of BIDR's IM-section came from a series of traditional scales, with some balancing adjustments made (e.g., balancing the motivational perspective and the skill-based perspective of IM).

=== Further developments ===
Researchers from multiple countries have developed their own culturally adapted versions of BIDR, including Japan, China.

Different versions of BIDR have developed for different populations, with some publicly available versions available for free.

The streamlining of the public version of BIDR is ongoing. In 2015, Hart and his colleagues developed BIDR-16, which is a publicly available shortened version of BIDR. In their original study, the correlation between BIDR-40 and BIDR-16 was approximately 0.84-0.87, but the internal consistency hovered around 0.70. Recent efforts have aimed to further reduce the number of items. Many studies have reported the progress of the BIDR-6 with varying results.

In 1998, Paulhus developed the commercial version of BIDR, named the Paulhus Deception Scales (PDS).

== Scale ==
BIDR consists of 40 questions that measures and differentiates the trait structure and the behavioral structure of respondents' social desirability. The 40 questions are divided into two groups. The first 20 questions are used to assess the existing trait structure: self-deception enhancement trait. The second 20 questions are used to assess the behavioral structure: impression management behaviors. In each group, there are ten positive scoring questions and ten negative scoring (i.e., reverse scoring) questions.

Each response to a question contains seven response options, ranging from 1 (not true) to 7 (very true), and only responses of 6-7 will be added 1 point. The overall score ranges from minimum=0 to maximum=20. Depending on the situation, responses that are more than one standard deviation above the mean can be considered to be a high score.

High scores in the SDE section indicates that the respondent may be unconsciously glorifying themselves, while high score in the IM section indicates that the individual has manipulated the answer to fit social circumstances.

Paulhus suggested that two sections of BIDR could be used separately. This suggestion has also been supported by some current research. There are also some studies that suggest this could lead to a loss of overall effectiveness.

== Reliability ==
In Paulhus's original study, the overall internal consistency of BIDR was 0.83. The internal consistency of the SDE section was 0.68-0.80, and the internal consistency of the IM section was 0.75-0.86.

The correlation between the BIDR results and the MC-SDS was r=0.71, and the correlation between the BIDR and the Social Desirability Inventory was r=0.80. The test-retest reliability of BIDR over a five-week follow-up period was 0.65-0.69.

Numerous studies have demonstrated that BIDR has a good reliability.

== Applications ==
=== Research of psychology ===
BIDR has been adopted by multiple psychological fields to collect research data. Those fields include Sport Psychology, Personality Psychology, Health Psychology, and Clinical Psychology.

=== Identifying fake responses ===
BIDR is widely used in different scenarios to identify and manage fake responses. The usage scenarios include Job Interviews, academic settings, treatment, and Criminal Investigation.

== Criticism ==
BIDR's original version had a large number of items with complex scoring rules, which was considered difficult to apply in practice. Additionally, the interpretation of BIDR's results requires certain skills from the user, which may result in additional usage costs.

A study suggested that using the IM section of BIDR alone in identifying fake scenarios is less effective than using MC-SDS.

Some psychologists suggested that the cases and endorsements of BIDR public version are fewer than MC-SDS, and the commercial version of BIDR is considered too expensive.

The original BIDR has cross-cultural applicability issues, it is therefore recommended to use versions that have been developed for particular cultures.

== See also ==
- Marlowe–Crowne Social Desirability Scale
- Social-desirability bias
- Delroy L. Paulhus
- 16PF Questionnaire
- Impression management
- Self-deception
- Superficial charm
