= Swiss Center for Affective Sciences =

The Swiss Center for Affective Sciences (French: Centre Interfacultaire en Sciences Affectives or "CISA" ) is a multidisciplinary and interdisciplinary research center based at the University of Geneva (Geneva, Switzerland).

The center was founded in 2005 under the direction of Prof. Klaus Scherer at the University of Geneva as the host institution of the National Center for Competence in Research (NCCR) Affective Sciences supported by the Swiss National Science Foundation (SNSF). The center has been directed by Prof. David Sander since 2011.

The Center brings together researchers from the natural sciences, humanities, and social sciences around the common goal of understanding emotions and other affective phenomena such as moods, stress, or well-being. It also develops methodologies and tools to study the neural, psychological, bodily and social underpinnings of affective phenomena. With this respect, the Center plays a role in the rise of affectivism in academia and beyond.

Likewise, the Center carries out applied research in collaboration with public and private partners.

In addition, the center offers an Education & Training program for researchers in affective sciences. It coordinates training activities for the members of the center and the academic community at large. The most important of them is the International Summer School in Affective Sciences (ISSAS), organized mainly for PhD students in the affective sciences from all over the world.

Lastly, thanks to outreach activities such as festivals and museum exhibits, the Center cooperates with Swiss and international cultural institutions to better communicate to society current knowledge about emotion.
