= Magda B. Arnold =

American psychologist (1903–2002)

Magda B. Arnold posing for Contemporary Psychology journal review (1961)

Magda Blondiau Arnold (born Magda Barta-Blondau; December 22, 1903 – October 5, 2002) was a Canadian psychologist who was the first contemporary theorist to develop appraisal theory of emotions, which moved away from "feeling" theories (e.g. James-Lange theory) and "behaviorist" theories (e.g. Cannon-Bard theory) toward the cognitive approach. She also created a new method of scoring the Thematic Apperception Test called Story Sequence Analysis.

She was a 1957 Guggenheim Fellow.

== Early life and education ==
Arnold was born in Moravská Třebová, Moravia, Austria-Hungary (now in the Czech Republic) to Rudolph Barta and Rosa Marie Blondiau, members of an opera company. An illegitimate child, she was fostered in poverty by a pair of sisters, and rarely saw her mother. She found community with the Wandervogel, a German youth nature movement. She also read voraciously through the books in her local library, and upon reading Freud at 16, concluded she wanted to be a psychologist. However her lack of an academic high school education made that impossible. She married Robert Arnold and moved to Prague. She sat-in on psychology classes at Charles University where she was employed as a secretary. In 1928, the Arnolds left Czechoslovakia and immigrated to Canada. They settled in Toronto and had three children: Joan, Margaret, and Katherine. Robert and Magda separated in 1935, and as a result Magda decided to pursue education in psychology.

Arnold studied psychology at the University of Toronto where she graduated with a bachelor's degree in 1939. She continued her graduate studies at the University of Toronto, studying the relationship between emotion and muscle tension as well as the emotional effect of adrenaline; she earned her master's degree in 1940, followed by her doctorate in 1942.

== Career ==
Upon the completion of her PhD in 1942, Arnold was employed at the University of Toronto, since many professors were off contributing to the war effort. In 1946 She was invited to be the Director of Research and Training at the Psychological Services for Canadian Veteran Affairs. In this period she developed a new method for scoring the Thematic Apperception Test (TAT), that would eventually result in the publication of her 1962 book Story Sequence Analysis: A New Method of Measuring Motivation and Predicting Achievement.

Concluding that she would never be permanently hired at Toronto, in 1947 Arnold accepted a position at Wellesley College. In the spring of 1948 Arnold attended the Eastern Psychological Association Conference in Philadelphia and had a late-night conversion experience in which she became convinced of the truth of the Christian faith. Shortly after this experience, while teaching a Harvard Summer School class, Arnold met Father John Gasson, S.J., a Jesuit psychologist and professor at Spring Hill College in Alabama. They began corresponding and Gasson encouraged her to return to the Catholic faith of her childhood. After some hesitation, she rejoined the church that November. Her newly recovered faith would influence both her career decisions and her scholarship.

In 1948, Arnold was hired as associate professor and department chair at Bryn Mawr College. She was joined by her eldest daughter, Joan. Two years later she became the department chair at a small Catholic women's college, Barat College, where she tried to help improve the academic environment. While there she hosted a workshop which brought together Catholic psychologists from around the world to formulate a distinctively Catholic psychology. Gasson and Arnold edited the workshop proceedings into a 1954 book The Human Person: An Approach To An Integral Theory Of Personality.

In 1952, Arnold left Barat for Loyola University (Chicago) which allowed her time to do her research. Her most important work, Emotion and Personality was published in 1960 and became known as a pioneering work in emotion which marked a turn towards the cognitive in emotion theory. She was appointed director of the Loyola Behavior Laboratory which allowed her to run animal studies to test some of her emotion theories.

In 1972, Arnold retired from Loyola and began teaching at Spring Hill College, to be near John Gasson and where she could do research on her Thematic Apperception Test. However she was disappointed with the lack support from the academic community and the research was a dead end. After her second retirement in 1975, Arnold used her time to finish writing her final book, Memory and the Brain, published 1984.

== Death ==
Arnold died in Tucson, Arizona, on October 5, 2002. She had moved to Tucson after John Gasson's death, to be nearer to two of her daughters.

== Contributions ==
=== Thematic Apperception Test ===
Post-schooling led Arnold to accept the position of Director of Research and Training for the Canadian Veteran Affairs Department. It was there she developed a system to analyze the Thematic Apperception Test. The system was different than previous measures because it could be used for both “normal and neurotic” patients. Arnold analyzed the test using five subheadings: parent-child situations, heterosexual situations, same-sex situations, singles, and miscellaneous. Each subheading has corresponding scenarios (stories) to compare the patient's responses. The comparisons are used to determine a dominant conflict, and necessary level of treatment.

=== Theory of Emotion ===
Arnold defines emotion as felt tendencies, which is contingent on two processes. (1) A person must perceive an emotion by receiving the external stimuli, remembering the emotion, then imagining the emotion. (2) Next, the emotion is appraised by acknowledging that the external stimuli affected oneself. Arnold characterized emotions as “action-tendencies.” Emotions and actions are linked through motivation, and motivation is reflected upon during appraisal.

Arnold theorized preceding emotions influence subsequent emotions. The three factors contributing to this idea are: affective memory, emotional attitude, and constancy of appraisal. Affective memory is the process of reliving previous experiences and applying the experience to the new situation. Emotional attitude is the imbalance of emotions, which influences appraisal. Constancy of appraisal is the lasting impression on whether the stimuli is good or bad. Arnold explains emotion functions as organized and disorganized. Emotions organize a person's relationship with the world, however emotions can interrupt goal-directed behavior.

=== Memory and the Brain ===
Arnold worked tirelessly to explain the relationship between brain function and memory. She conducted animal research and focused heavily on published work (due to lab restrictions). Arnold faced difficulties with international cooperation followed by publishing delays. Arnold's view on memory was influenced by appraisal; she emphasized memory is a dynamic process. Her work is considered ahead of her time, which influenced later researchers when brain-mapping technology was available.

=== Other contributions ===
She organized the Toronto Psychology Club to open the lines of discussion among professional colleagues. The club became the Ontario Psychological Association in 1947. She developed workshops to train psychologists in personality testing, which was uncommon due to the popularity of intelligence testing. The workshops focused on improving the quality of life of military veterans following World War II. In 1948, Arnold represented female researchers at the Mooseheart Symposium on Feelings and Emotion.

== Works ==
- Arnold, M. B., & Gasson, J. A. (1954). The human person: An approach to an integral theory of personality. New York: The Ronald Press.
- Arnold, M. B. (1960). Emotion and personality. New York: Columbia University Press.
- Arnold, M. B. (1962). Story sequence analysis: A new method of measuring motivation and predicting achievement. New York: Columbia University Press.
- Arnold, M. B. (1984). Memory and the brain. Hillsdale, NJ: Erlbaum. ISBN 9780898592900.

== Sources ==
- Cornelius, R. R. (2006). Magda Arnold's Thomistic theory of emotion, the self-ideal, and the moral dimension of appraisal. Cognition & Emotion, 20, 976–1000.
- Fields, R. M. (2004, Spring). "A life of Science and Spirituality: Magda B. Arnold (1903–2002)" The Feminist Psychologist, pp. 11–12.
- García-Alandete, J. (2024). "Magda Arnold’s understanding of the human person: Thomistic personalism, psychophysical unity of the person, integration of personality, and transcendence." History of Psychology, 27(2), 159–177. https://doi.org/10.1037/hop0000247
- Held, L. "Magda Arnold." In A. Rutherford (Ed.), Psychology's Feminist Voices.
- Rodkey, E. N. (2015). "Magda Arnold and the human person: A mid-century case study on the relationship between psychology and religion." Doctoral Dissertation, York University, Toronto.
- Rodkey, E. N. (2017). “Very much in love”: The letters of Magda Arnold and Father John Gasson. Journal of the History of the Behavioral Sciences, 53, 286–304.
- Rodkey, K. L., & Rodkey, E. N. (2020). Family, friends, and faith-communities: Intellectual community and the benefits of unofficial networks for marginalized scientists. History of Psychology, 23(4), 289–311
- Shields, S. A. (1999). A conversation with Magda Arnold. The Emotion Researcher, 13(3), 3.
- Shields, S. A. (2006). Magda B. Arnold: Pioneer in research on emotion. In D. Dewsbury, L. Benjamin, & M. Wertheimer (Eds.), Portraits of pioneers in psychology (Vol. IV). Washington, DC: American Psychological Association.
- Shields, S. A. (2006). Magda B. Arnold's life and work in context. Cognition & Emotion, 20, 902–919.
- Shields, S. A. & Fields, R. (2003). Magda B. Arnold (1903–2002). American Psychologist, 58, 403–404.
- Shields, S. A. & Kappas, A. (2006). Magda B. Arnold's contributions to emotions research. Cognition & Emotion, 20, 898–901.
- Stevens, G. & Gardner, S. (1982). Unacknowledged genius: Magda Blondiau Arnold (1903–). In G. Stevens and S. Gardner, The women of psychology, Vol. II: Expansion and refinement (pp. 126–129). Cambridge, MA: Schenkman Publishing Company.
