= Richard Lazarus =

American psychologist (1922–2002)

Transactional Model of Stress and Coping of Richard Lazarus

Richard S. Lazarus (March 3, 1922 – November 24, 2002) was an American psychologist who began rising to prominence in the 1960s. A Review of General Psychology survey, published in 2002, ranked Lazarus as the 80th most cited psychologist of the 20th century. He was well renowned for his theory of cognitive-mediational theory within emotion.

== Career ==
After graduating from City College of New York and the University of Pittsburgh, Lazarus joined the faculty at the University of California, Berkeley in 1957.

During the 1970s, Lazarus worked with PhD student Susan Folkman studying stress and coping. In her doctoral thesis, Folkman coined the terms "problem-focused coping" and "emotion-focused coping". Lazarus and Folkman co-authored a book called "Stress, Appraisal and Coping" in 1984, which worked through the theory of psychological stress, using concepts of Cognitive appraisal and coping. In this book, they were the first to make the distinction between "problem-focused coping" and "emotion-focused coping" which could result in consequences for both physical and mental health. They described "emotion-focused coping" as dealing with stress by regulating one's emotions and "problem-focused coping" as "directly changing the elements of the stressful situation".

== Research ==
Lazarus advocated the importance of emotion, especially what he described as the marriage between emotion and thought. His views put him at odds not only with behaviorism but also with a movement that began toward the end of his career: attempts to explain all human behavior by looking at the structure of the brain. He was very opposed to reductionist approaches to understanding human behavior.

Lazarus' cognitive-mediational theory maintained that the interaction between emotion-eliciting conditions and coping processes affect the cognitions that drive emotional reactions. For example, the degree of a perceived threat affects an individual's emotional and psychological response to such life events in the future. At the heart of Lazarus's theory was what he called appraisal. Before emotion occurs, he argued, people make an automatic, often unconscious, assessment of what is happening and what it may mean for them or those they care about. From that perspective, emotion becomes not just rational but a necessary component of survival. According to Lazarus, there are two kinds of appraisal: primary appraisal, which is aimed at establishing the significance of an event's meaning to the organism; and, secondary appraisal, which assesses the ability of the organism to cope with the consequences of the event.

Lazarus worked on topics such as hope and gratitude. He was perhaps best known for his work with Susan Folkman on coping, gaining attention for studies that showed that patients who engaged in denial about the seriousness of their situation did better than those who were more "realistic." He also found that stress often had less to do with a person's actual situation than with how the person perceived the strength of his own resources.

=== Emotion definition ===
Lazarus (1991) defines emotions according to 'core relational themes' which are intuitive summaries of the 'moral appraisals' (e.g. of relevance, goal conduciveness) involved in different emotions. These themes help define both the function and eliciting conditions of the emotion. They include:

- Anger - a demeaning offense against me and mine.
- Fear - facing an immediate, concrete, and overwhelming physical danger.
- Sadness - having experienced an irrevocable loss.
- Disgust - taking in or being too close to an indigestible object or idea (metaphorically speaking).
- Happiness - making reasonable progress toward the realization of a goal.

== Known publications ==
- Adjustment and Personality, 1961
- Personality and adjustment, 1963, Englewood Cliffs, N.J: Prentice-Hall.
- The Nature of Psychological Inquiry, 1964
- Psychological stress and the coping process, 1966, New York: McGraw-Hill.
- Personality, 1971, (2nd edition) Englewood Cliffs, N.J: Prentice-Hall.
- Patterns of adjustment and human effectiveness, 1968, New York: McGraw-Hill.
- Patterns of adjustment, 1976, (3rd edition), New York: McGraw-Hill.
- "A cognitively oriented psychologist looks at biofeedback". American Psychologist. 30 (5), 553-561
- "On the primacy of cognition". American Psychologist, 1984. 39 (2) 124-129
- The riddle of man: An introduction to psychology, Englewood Cliffs, N.J: Prentice-Hall.
- Emotion and adaptation, 1991, New York: Oxford University Press. ISBN 978-0-19-509266-0
- The life and work of an eminent psychologist, 1998, New York: Springer. ISBN 978-0-8261-1179-1
- Coping with aging, 2005, Oxford University Press, USA (December 23, 2005) ISBN 978-0-19-517302-4
- with Monat, Alan Personality, 1979, (3rd edition) Englewood Cliff, N.J.: Prentice-Hall.
- with Folkman, Susan Stress, appraisal, and coping, 1984, New York: Springer Pub. Co ISBN 978-0-8261-4191-0
- with Folkman, Susan Manual for the Hassles and uplifts scales Research edition., 1989, Palo Alto, Calif.: Consulting Psychologists Press.
- "Why We Should Think of Stress as a Subset of Emotion", in Handbook of Stress: Theoretical and Clinical Aspects, 2nd ed., L Goldberger and S. Breznitz (ed), New York, N.Y., Free Press, 1993.
- with Lazarus, Bernice N Passion and Reason: Making Sense of Our Emotions, 1994, Passion and reason: Making sense of our emotions New York: Oxford University Press ISBN 978-0-19-510461-5
- Fifty years of the research and theory of R.S. Lazarus: An analysis of historical and perennial issues, 1998, Mahwah, N.J.: Lawerence Erlbaum Associates. ISBN 978-0-8058-2657-9
- Stress and emotion: A new synthesis, 1999, New York: Springer Pub. Co. ISBN 978-0-8261-0261-4
- Stress Treatment and Management (2 Volumes), volume one ISBN 978-613-9-44797-8 volume two ISBN 978-613-9-45532-4
