= Appraisal theory =

Psychological theory

Appraisal theory is the theory in psychology that emotions are extracted from our evaluations (appraisals or estimates) of events that cause specific reactions in different people. Essentially, our appraisal of a situation causes an emotional, or affective, response that is going to be based on that appraisal. An example of this is going on a first date. If the date is perceived as positive, one might feel happiness, joy, giddiness, excitement, and/or anticipation, because they have appraised this event as one that could have positive long-term effects, i.e. starting a new relationship, engagement, or even marriage. On the other hand, if the date is perceived negatively, then our emotions, as a result, might include dejection, sadness, emptiness, or fear. (Scherer et al., 2001) Reasoning and understanding of one's emotional reaction becomes important for future appraisals as well. The important aspect of the appraisal theory is that it accounts for individual variability in emotional reactions to the same event.

Appraisal theories of emotion are theories that state that emotions result from people's interpretations and explanations of their circumstances even in the absence of physiological arousal (Aronson, 2005). There are two basic approaches; the structural approach and process model. These models both provide an explanation for the appraisal of emotions and explain in different ways how emotions can develop. In the absence of physiological arousal we decide how to feel about a situation after we have interpreted and explained the phenomena. Thus the sequence of events is as follows: event, thinking, and simultaneous events of arousal and emotion. Social psychologists have used this theory to explain and predict coping mechanisms and people's patterns of emotionality. By contrast, for example, personality psychology studies emotions as a function of a person's personality, and thus does not take into account the person's appraisal, or cognitive response, to a situation. Personality psychology relates to analyzing factors that influence how people are similar to one another and their unique differences.

The main controversy surrounding these theories argues that emotions cannot happen without physiological arousal.

== History ==
For the past several decades, appraisal theory has developed and evolved as a prominent theory in the field of communication and psychology by testing affect and emotion. In history, the most basic ideology dates back to some of the most notable philosophers such as Aristotle, Plato, the Stoics, Spinoza and Hume, and even early German psychologist Stumpf (Reisenzein & Schonpflug, 1992). However, in the past fifty years, this theory has expanded exponentially with the dedication of two prominent researchers: Magda Arnold and Richard Lazarus, amongst others who have contributed appraisal theories.

The question studied under appraisal theories is why people react to things differently. Even when presented with the same, or a similar situation all people will react in slightly different ways based on their perception of the situation. These perceptions elicit various emotions that are specific to each person. About 30 years ago, psychologists and researchers began to categorize these emotions into different groups. This is where cognitive appraisal theory stems from. They decided to categorize these emotional reaction behaviors as appraisals. The two main theories of appraisal are the structural model and the process model. These models are broken down into subtypes as well (Smith & Kirby, 2009). Researchers have attempted to specify particular appraisals of events that elicit emotions (Roseman et al., 1996).

=== Magda Arnold ===
Dating back to the 1940s and 1950s, Magda Arnold took an interest in researching the appraisal of emotions accompanying general arousal. Specifically, Arnold wanted to "introduce the idea of emotion differentiation by postulating that emotions such as fear, anger, and excitement could be distinguished by different excitatory phenomena" (Arnold, 1950). With these new ideas, she developed her "cognitive theory" in the 1960s, which specified that the first step in emotion is an appraisal of the situation. According to Arnold, the initial appraisals start the emotional sequence and arouse both the appropriate actions and the emotional experience itself, so that the physiological changes, recognized as important, accompany, but do not initiate, the actions and experiences (Arnold, 1960a). A notable advancement was Arnold's idea of intuitive appraisal in which she describes emotions that are good or bad for the person lead to an action. For example, if a student studies hard in a difficult class and passes the tough mid-term exam with an "A", the felt emotion of happiness will motivate the student to keep studying hard for that class.

Emotion is a difficult concept to define as emotions are constantly changing for each individual, but Arnold's continued advancements and changing theory led her to keep researching her work within appraisal theory. The 1970s were difficult as fellow researchers challenged her theory with questions concerning the involvement of psycho-physiological factors and the psychological experiences at the Loyola Symposium on Feelings and Emotions. Despite this and re-evaluating the theory, Arnold's discoveries paved the way for other researchers to learn about variances of emotion, affect, and their relation to each other.

=== Richard Lazarus ===
Following close to Magda Arnold in terms of appraisal theory examination was Richard Lazarus who continued to research emotions through appraisal theory before his death in 2002. Since he began researching in the 1950s, this concept evolves and expands to include new research, methods, and procedures. Although Arnold had a difficult time with questions, Lazarus and other researchers discussed the biopsychological components of the theory at the Loyola Symposium ("Towards a Cognitive Theory of Emotion").

Specifically, he identified two essential factors in an essay in which he discusses the cognitive aspects of emotion: "first, what is the nature of the cognitions (or appraisals) which underlie separate emotional reactions (e.g. fear, guilt, grief, joy, etc.). Second, what are the determining antecedent conditions of these cognitions." (Lazarus, Averill, & Opton (1970, p. 219) These two aspects are absolutely crucial in defining the reactions that stem from the initial emotions that underlie the reactions. Moreover, Lazarus specified two major types of appraisal methods which sit at the crux of the appraisal method: 1) primary appraisal, directed at the establishment of the significance or meaning of the event to the organism, and 2) secondary appraisal, directed at the assessment of the ability of the organism to cope with the consequences of the event. These two types go hand in hand as one establishes the importance of the event while the following assesses the coping mechanisms which Lazarus divided up into two parts: direct actions and cognitive reappraisal processes.

To simplify Lazarus's theory and emphasize his stress on cognition, as you are experiencing an event, your thought must precede the arousal and emotion (which happen simultaneously). For example: You are about to give a speech in front of 50 of your peers. First, you think: "I've never spoken in front of such a big crowd. I'm going to make a fool of myself." Then, Your mouth goes dry, your heart beat quickens, your palms sweat, and your legs begin to shake and at the same time you experience fear.

== Varieties ==
=== Structural model ===
Transactional Model of Stress and Coping of Richard Lazarus

The structural model of appraisal helps to explain the relation between appraisals and the emotions they elicit. This model involves examination of the appraisal process as well as examination of how different appraisals influence which emotions are experienced. According to Lazarus (1991), theories of emotion involve a relational aspect, a motivational aspect, and a cognitive aspect (Lazarus, 1991). The relational aspect involves the relationship between a person and the environment and suggests that emotions always involve an interaction between the two (Lazarus, 1991). The motivational aspect involves an assessment of the status of one's goals and is the aspect of the evaluation of a situation in which a person determines how relevant the situation is to his or her goals (Lazarus, 1991). Finally, the cognitive component involves one's appraisal of the situation, or an evaluation of how relevant and significant a situation is to one's life (Lazarus, 1991). Lazarus suggests that different emotions are elicited when situations are evaluated differently according to these three categories. In order to evaluate each emotion individually, however, a structural model of appraisal is necessary (Lazarus, 1991). This model allows for the individual components of the appraisal process to be determined for each emotion. In addition, this model allows for the evaluation of how and where the appraisal processes differ for different emotions (Lazarus, 1991).

==== Primary appraisal ====
The appraisal process is broken up into two different categories, primary appraisal and secondary appraisal (Lazarus, 1991). In a person's primary appraisal, he or she evaluates two aspects of a situation: the motivational relevance and the motivational congruence (Smith & Kirby, 2009). When evaluating motivational relevance, an individual answers the question, "How relevant is this situation to my needs?" Thus, the individual evaluates how important the situation is to his or her well-being. The motivational relevance aspect of the appraisal of the process has been shown to influence the intensity of the experienced emotions so that when a situation is highly relevant to one's well-being, the situation elicits a more intense emotional response (Smith & Kirby, 2009). The second aspect of an individual's primary appraisal of a situation is the evaluation of motivational congruence. When evaluating the motivational congruence of a situation, an individual answers the question, "Is this situation congruent or incongruent (consistent or inconsistent) with my goals?" (Smith & Kirby, 2009). Individuals experience different emotions when they view a situation as consistent with their goals than when they view it as inconsistent.

==== Secondary appraisal ====
People's emotions are also influenced by their secondary appraisal of situations. Secondary appraisal involves people's evaluation of their resources and options for coping (Lazarus, 1991). One aspect of secondary appraisal is a person's evaluation of who should be held accountable. A person can hold herself, another, or a group of other people accountable for the situation at hand. Blame may be given for a harmful event and credit may be given for a beneficial event (Lazarus, 1991). In addition, an individual might also see the situation as due to chance. The way in which people view who or what should be held accountable directs and guides their efforts to cope with the emotions they experience. Another aspect of secondary appraisal is a person's coping potential. Coping potential is potential to use either problem-focused coping or emotion-focused coping strategies to handle an emotional experience. (Smith & Kirby, 2009). Problem-focused coping refers to one's ability to take action and to change a situation to make it more congruent with one's goals (Smith & Kirby, 2009). Thus, a person's belief about their ability to perform problem-focused coping influences the emotions they experience in the situation. On the other hand, emotion-focused coping refers to one's ability to handle or adjust to the situation should the circumstances remain inconsistent with one's goals (Smith & Kirby, 2009). Again, the emotions people experience are influenced by how they perceive their ability to perform emotion-focused coping. The fourth component of secondary appraisal is one's future expectancy (Lazarus, 1991). Future expectancy refers to one's expectations of change in the motivational congruence of a situation (for any reason). Thus, an individual may believe the situation will change favorably or unfavorably (Lazarus, 1991). One's future expectancy influences the emotions elicited during a situation as well as the coping strategies used.

The structural model of appraisal suggests that the answers to the different component questions of the primary and secondary categories allow researchers to predict which emotions will be elicited from a certain set of circumstances. In other words, the theory suggests that researchers are able to examine an individual's appraisal of a situation and then predict the emotional experiences of that individual based upon his or her views of the situation. An example of a particular emotion and its underlying appraisal components can be seen when examining the emotion of anger. If a person appraises a situation as motivationally relevant, motivationally incongruent, and also holds a person other than himself accountable, the individual would most likely experience anger in response to the situation (Smith & Haynes, 1993). Another example of the appraisal components of an emotion can be given in regards to anxiety. Like anger, anxiety comes from the evaluation of a situation as motivationally relevant and motivationally incongruent (Lazarus, 1991). However, where anxiety differs from anger is in who is held accountable. For anger, another person or group of people is held accountable or blamed for a wrongdoing. However, in regards to anxiety, there is no obvious person or group to hold accountable or to blame. The structural model of appraisal allows for researchers to assess different appraisal components that lead to different emotions.

=== Process model ===
Appraisal theory, however, has often been critiqued for failing to capture the dynamic nature of emotion. To better analyze the complexities of emotional appraisal, social psychologists have sought to further complement the structural model. One suggested approach was a cyclical process, which moves from appraisal to coping, and then reappraisal, attempting to capture a more long-term theory of emotional responses (Smith & Lazarus 1990). This model, however, failed to hold up under scholarly and scientific critique, largely due to the fact that it fails to account for the often rapid or automatic nature of emotional responses (Marsella & Gratch 2009). Further addressing the concerns raised with structural and cyclical models of appraisal, two different theories emerged that advocated a process model of appraisal.

==== Two-process model of appraisal ====
Smith and Kirby (2000) argue for a two-process model of appraisal, which expands on the function of the structural model of appraisal. While the structural model of appraisal focuses on what one is evaluating, the process model of appraisal focuses on how one evaluates emotional stimuli. There are three main components to the process model of appraisal: perceptual stimuli, associative processing, and reasoning. Perceptual stimuli are what the individual picks up from his or her surroundings, such as sensations of pain or pleasure, perception of facial expression (Smith & Kirby 2000). In addition to these stimuli, the process model is composed to two main appraisal processes. Associative processing is a memory-based process that makes quick connections and provides appraisal information based on activated memories that are quickly associated with the given stimulus (Marsella & Gratch 2009). Reasoning is a slower, more deliberate, and thorough process that involves logical, critical thinking about the stimulus and/or situation (Marsella & Gratch 2009). In the two-process model of appraisal theory, associative processing and reasoning work in parallel in reaction to perceptual stimuli, thus providing a more complex and cognitively based appraisal of the emotional encounter (Smith & Kirby 2000).

==== Scherer's multi-level sequential check model ====
An alternative process model of appraisal, Scherer's multi-level sequential check model is made up of three levels of appraisal process, with sequential constraints at each level of processing that create a specifically ordered processing construct (Scherer 2001). The three levels of processing are: innate (sensory-motor), learned (schema-based), and deliberate (conceptual) (Marsella & Gratch 2009). Further, Scherer constructs a strict, ordered progression by which these appraisal processes are carried out. There are various evaluation checks throughout the processes, which allow for observation of stimuli at different points in the process sequence, thus creating a sort of step-by-step appraisal process (Scherer 2001). Such checks include: a relevance (novelty and relevance to goals) check, followed by an implication check (cause, goal conduciveness, and urgency), then coping potential check (control and power), and finally the check for normative significance (compatibility with one's standards) (Marsella & Gratch 2009). While the two-process model involves processes occurring at the same time, parallel to one another, Scherer's multi-level sequential check model is composed of processes that take place in a specific sequence.

=== Roseman's theory of appraisal ===
Roseman's theory of appraisal holds that there are certain appraisal components that interact to elicit different emotions (Roseman, 1996). One appraisal component that influences which emotion is expressed is motive consistency. When one evaluates a situation as inconsistent with one's goals, the situation is considered motivationally inconsistent and often elicits a negative emotion, such as anger or regret (Roseman, 1996). A second component of appraisal that influences the emotional response of an individual is the evaluation of responsibility or accountability (Roseman, 1996). A person can hold oneself or another person or group accountable. An individual might also believe the situation was due to chance. An individual's evaluation of accountability influences which emotion is experienced. For example, if one feels responsible for a desirable situation, pride may be an emotion that is experienced.

In addition to the two appraisal components, the different intensities of each component also influence which emotion or emotions are elicited. Specifically, the certainty and the strength of the evaluation of accountability influences which emotions are experienced (Roseman, 1996). In addition, the appetitive or aversive nature of motive consistency also influences the emotions that are elicited (Roseman, 1996).

Roseman's theory of appraisal suggests that motive consistency and accountability are the two most important components of the appraisal process (1996). In addition, the different levels of intensity of each component are important and greatly influence the emotions that are experienced due to a particular situation.

=== Structural v. process oriented models ===
Most models currently advanced are more concerned with structure or contents of appraisals than with process oriented appraisal. "These Gendy models attempt to specify the evaluations that initiate specific emotional reactions. Examination of these models indicates that although there is significant overlap [between the two types of structural models], there also differences: in which appraisals are included; how particular appraisals are operationalized; which emotions are encompassed by a model; and which particular combinations of appraisals are proposed to elicit a particular emotional response." (Scherer et al., 2001). Ultimately, structurally based appraisals rely on the idea that our appraisals cultivate the emotional responses. Process-oriented models of appraisal theory are rooted in the idea that it is important to specify the cognitive principles and operations underlying these appraisal modes. Using this orientation for evaluating appraisals, we find fewer issues with repression, a "mental process by which distressing thoughts, memories, or impulses that may give rise to anxiety are excluded from consciousness and left to operate in the unconscious" (Merriam-Webster, 2007).

=== Continuous v. categorical nature of appraisal and emotion ===
Within the continuous versus categorical nature of appraisal and emotion, there are many standpoints of the flow of this appraisal process. To begin, Roseman's (1996) model shows that appraisal information "can vary continuously but categorical boundaries determine which emotion will occur". Motive consistency and inconsistency make up an example of this categorical framework. A positive or negative emotional response in conjunction with the affect has much to do with the appraisal and the amount of motivational consistency. To accurately understand this concept, an example of Roseman's model could come from a motive-consistent goal as it is caused by the self and someone else to reach one's objective in which a positive emotion is created from the specific appraisal event. In addition, Scherer's (1984) model shows that most appraisal falls in a continuous spectrum in which points along the way represent distinct emotional points made possible from the appraisal. Between appraisal space and number of emotions experienced, these two components are both positively correlated. "According to Scherer (1984a), the major categorical labels we used to describe our emotional experiences reflect a somewhat crude attempt to highlight and describe the major or most important ways these emotional experiences vary". With so much variation and levels within one's emotions, it can be seen as injustice to the emotional experience and the appraisal process to limit oneself to such categories. To solve the problem between categorical and continuous appraisal order, it may be a good idea to place discrete emotional categories (i.e. happiness, sadness, etc.) while continuous models represent the varieties, styles, and levels of these already defined distinct emotions.

== Empirical findings and real world applications ==
Stanley Schachter's contributions should also be noted as his studies supported the relevance of emotion induced in appraisal. In 1962, Schachter and Jerome E. Singer devised an experiment to explain the physiological and psychological factors in emotional appraising behaviors. By inducing an experimental group with epinephrine while maintaining a control group, they were able to test two emotions: euphoria and anger. Using a stooge to elicit a response, the research proved three major findings relevant to appraisal:

1. Both cognitive and physiological factors contribute to emotion;
2. Under certain circumstances cognition follows physiological arousal; and
3. People assess their emotional state, in part, by observing how physiologically stirred up they are (Schachter & Singer, 1962)

By taking into account heightened emotion, reaction to the stooge, as well as prompted questions, all these elicited factors provide a negative or positive affect. Although the study took place in 1962, it is still studied in both psychology and communication fields today as an example of appraisal theory in relation to affect and emotion. Through these findings, Schachter and Singer assess that an event happens which in turn elicits as physiological arousal. From the reasoning of the arousal, you are then able to have an emotion. For example: You are about to give a speech. You approach the podium and look out into the audience as your mouth goes dry, your heart beat quickens, your palms sweat, and your legs begin to shake. From this arousal, you understand you feel this way because you are about to give a speech in front of 50 of your peers. This feeling causes anxiety and you experience the emotion of fear.

In a study aimed at defining stress and the role of coping, conducted by Dewe (1991), significant relationships between primary appraisal, coping, and emotional discomfort were recorded. It was proven that primary appraisal was the main contributor of predicting how someone will cope. This finding enables psychologists to be able to begin to predict the emotion that will be elicited by a certain event and may give rise to an easier way to predict how well someone will cope with their emotion.

A study by Rogers & Holmbeck (1997) explores a previous finding that "the psychological impact of interparental conflict on children is influenced by children's cognitive appraisals." The researchers hypothesized that cognitive appraisal and coping would help moderate variables for the children, and therefore the emotional impact of parent conflict would vary based on the nature of the child's "appraisals and coping strategies" (Rogers & Holmbeck 1997). The researchers tested coping strategies and measured child adjustment based on the children's self-reported emotional and behavioral adjustment, determined from levels of self-worth and depression (Rogers & Holmbeck 1997). The results demonstrated a significant negative main effect of problematic cognitive appraisal on self-worth and a significant positive main effect of problematic cognitive appraisal on depression, thus showing the impact of cognitive appraisal on children's emotional well being and ability to deal with interparental conflict (Rogers & Holmbeck 1997). This study demonstrates the significance of cognitive appraisal in coping with emotionally difficult circumstances and their own behavioral adjustment and self-esteem. An understanding of the role of cognitive appraisal and cognitive appraisal theories can assist psychologists in understanding and facilitating coping strategies, which could contribute to work in the field that acts to facilitate healthy behavioral adjustment and coping strategies in individuals.

In another study conducted by Jacobucci (2000), findings suggested that individual differences and primary appraisals had a very strong correlation. This shows that primary appraisal is a function of personality and may be stable over time. This in fact is a very strong finding for social psychologists because it proves that if we can predict the primary appraisal strategy and thinking pattern of an individual, then coping patterns and emotional tendencies of an individual may be able to be predicted in any situation and social setting.

A study by Verduyn, Mechelen, & Tuerlinckx (2011) explores the factors that affect the duration of an emotional experience. One aspect of the research focuses on the difference between rumination versus reappraisal of an emotional event, exploring how they affect the duration of an emotional experience, and in which direction (shortening or lengthening) (Verduyn et al. 2011). The researchers argue that cognition is very significant to the duration and experience of emotion, claiming that "thoughts appear to act as fuel that stirs up the emotional fire and leads to a prolongation of the episode" (Verduyn et al. 2011). Further, the researchers reference the significance of emotions "lining up with" initial appraisals of the emotion-eliciting experience, which then strengthens the emotion and may lead to prolongation of the experience (Verduyn et al. 2011). This concept alludes to the significance of congruence among emotions, appraisal, and cognitions. This particular article discusses the coping effect of appraisal and reappraisal, claiming reappraisal can act as an "adaptive strategy," while rumination is not (Verduyn et al. 2011). Both reappraisal (or initial cognitive appraisal) and rumination, however, can affect the duration of an emotional experience. This study demonstrates the significance of cognitive appraisal by indicating its role in the duration of an emotional experience. Because the duration of an emotional experience can have significant effects on how an individual reacts to given stimuli, and thus have relevant real-world application in how individuals deal with emotional experiences. This study also presents reappraisal—appraising the emotional situation in a new way—can act as an adaptive strategy to deal with difficult circumstances, thus further highlighting the necessity of cognitive appraisal to coping with emotional stressors.

One study completed by Folkman et al. (1986) focuses on the relationship between appraisal and coping processes that are used across stressful events, and indicators of long-term adaptation. They define primary appraisal as "the stakes a person has in a stressful encounter," and secondary appraisal as "options for coping." Eighty-five California married couples with at least one child were the participants of the study, and they were interviewed in their homes once a month for 6 months. In each interview the subject was asked what their most stressful event was in the previous week, and then interviewer asked them structured questions about how they dealt with that stressor. There was a significant gender difference in primary appraisal. They also concluded that coping strategies were dependent upon psychological and somatic problems as well (Folkman, Lazarus, Gruen & DeLongis, 1986).

In another study by Folkman, the goal was to look at the relationship between cognitive appraisal and coping processes and their short-term outcomes within stressful situations. Subjects were interviewed once a month for six months. Primary and secondary appraisals were assessed using different subscales. This study found that there is a functional relationship among appraisal and coping and the outcomes of stressful situations. There were significant positive correlations between primary appraisal and coping. There were also significant correlations between secondary appraisal and coping, and they were very specific about the type of stressful situation and with which each would help the most. For example, they found that appraisals of changeability and having to hold back from acting were related to the encounter outcomes (Folkman, Lazarus, Dunkel-Schetter, DeLongis & Gruen, 1986).

In another experiment that was based on this concept of appraisal theory (Lazarus 1991, 1990), a study completed by Amy M. Bippus and Stacy L. Young (2012) looked to closely examine the role of primary as well as secondary appraisals of those receiving hurtful messages, such as cyber bullying, and how this played an effect into how much hurt those people felt upon receiving these messages and also affected how they chose to cope with their pain. The experiment itself aimed to change the role that being emotionally hurt was perceived as in the appraisal process, because in this study, hurt was to be viewed as outcome of appraisal as opposed to other studies that have normally observed the aspect of hurt to be a precedent to the appraisal process. For this study, the researchers gathered a sum of 217 willing participants, which composed of 64 males as well as 153 females, all of whom were collegiate communications studies students who were receiving extra credit in a class for their time. These participants were then given a questionnaire to complete that involved being instructed to explain, in Bippus and Young's words, "the most recent situation in which your feelings were hurt," including aspects such as hurt that was caused by romantic partners, family members, close friends, etc. After this was done, both of the participants' primary and secondary appraisals were measured. The results of this study went on to show that the primary and secondary appraisals of the participants were only meekly able to predict the coping mechanisms that the participants took part in, but, on the other hand, were rather strong predictors as to what emotion they ended up feeling, as those receiving the messages were more likely to be hurt when they viewed the messages as rather intended or out of spite instead of a misunderstood form of humor in bad taste. These findings were able to continue to be in support of this concept of appraisal theory, as the primary and secondary appraisals of the participants were able to predict the emotion that was felt by the individuals more-so than the coping mechanisms they would involve themselves in.

== More appraisal theories of emotion ==
Many current theories of emotion now place the appraisal component of emotion at the forefront in defining and studying emotional experience. However, most contemporary psychologists who study emotion accept a working definition acknowledging that emotion is not just appraisal but a complex multifaceted experience with the following components:

1. Subjective feelings. The appraisal is accompanied by feelings that are good or bad, pleasant or unpleasant, calm or aroused.
2. Physiological arousal. Emotions are accompanied by autonomic nervous system activity. Arousal is defined as "to rouse or stimulate to action or to physiological readiness for activity" (Merriam-Webster, 2007). According to Schachter and Singer (1962) we can have arousal without emotion, but we cannot have an emotion without arousal. Essentially, humans injected with epinephrine without knowing the actual content of the injection, feel an increase in heart rate, sweating, and nervousness, but that does not elicit an affective response. When the same physiological responses are paired with a contextual pretext, winning the lottery, for example, the state of arousal is appraised to mean extreme excitement, joy, and happiness. Without a context, we feel aroused, but cannot label it as an emotional response to a stimulus. If a context is present, we can evaluate our arousal in terms of that context, and thus an emotional response is present.
3. Expressive behaviors. Emotion is communicated through facial and bodily expressions, postural and voice changes.
4. Action tendencies. Emotions carry behavioral intentions, and the readiness to act in certain ways.

== See also ==
- Affect display
- Attitude change
- Emotions and culture
- Emotional expression
- Emotional intelligence
- Empathy
- Information processing (psychology)
- Magda B. Arnold
- Reversal theory
- Richard Lazarus
- Stoicism
