= Lance Rips =

American psychologist

- Born: Lance Jeffrey Rips; December 19, 1947 (age 78)
- Education: Swarthmore College; Stanford University
- Awards: Fulbright Fellowship (2004–05); Guggenheim Fellowship (2008)
- Scientific career
- Fields: Psychology
- Institutions: Northwestern University
- Thesis: Induction and Natural Categories (1974)

Lance Jeffrey Rips (born December 19, 1947) is an American psychologist and professor in the Department of Psychology at Northwestern University. Before joining Northwestern in 1994, he taught at the University of Chicago for nineteen years. His research has focused on human memory and deductive reasoning, among other topics. He received a Fulbright Fellowship in 2004 and 2005, and he was a Guggenheim Fellow in 2008. In addition, he is a fellow of the Cognitive Science Society, American Psychological Association, the Association for Psychological Science, and the Society of Experimental Psychologists.

== Research ==
Rips's research has ranged from studies of human concepts to reasoning and to autobiographical memory and survey methods. Along with Edward Smith, Edward Shoben, and Eleanor Rosch, he helped establish the role of prototypes in people's knowledge of natural categories. His experiments on prototypes in inductive reasoning started a stream of research on category-based inductive reasoning. Later work focused on deductive reasoning, developing a computational theory along the lines of natural deduction in logic. More recent work includes studies of number systems, concepts of individual objects, and explanation.

== Selected works ==
=== Articles ===
- Rips, L. J. (2020). Possible objects: Topological approaches to individuation. Cognitive Science, 44(11).
- Rips, L. J., & Hespos, S. J. (2015). Divisions of the physical world: Concepts of objects and substances. Psychological Bulletin, 141, 786-811.
- Rips, L. J., & Thompson, S. (2014). Possible number systems. Cognitive, Affective, and Behavioral Neuroscience, 14, 3-23.
- Rips, L. J., Bloomfield, A., & Asmuth, J. (2008). From numerical concepts to concepts of number. Behavioral and Brain Sciences, 31, 623-642.
- Rips, L. J., Blok, S., & Newman, G. (2006). Tracing the identity of objects. Psychological Review, 113, 1-30.
- Rips, L. J. (2000). The cognitive nature of instantiation. Journal of Memory and Language, 43, 20-43.

=== Authored books ===
- Rips, L. J. (2011). Lines of thought: Central concepts in cognitive psychology. Oxford, UK: Oxford University Press.
- Tourangeau, R., Rips, L. J., & Rasinski, K. (2000). The psychology of survey response. Cambridge, UK: Cambridge University Press.
- Rips, L. J. (1994). The psychology of proof: Deduction in human thinking. Cambridge, MA: MIT Press.
