= Bogus pipeline =

Fake polygraph used to bring out honesty

The bogus pipeline is an augmented polygraph, a pseudoscientific device or procedure used to purportedly detect lies. The polygraph is used to get participants to truthfully respond to emotional/affective questions in a survey. It is a technique used by social psychologists to reduce false answers when attempting to collect self-report data. As an example, social desirability is a common reason for skewed survey results.

The bogus pipeline was first used in the spring of 1971 by psychology professor Harold Sigall at the University of Rochester. He wanted to know if prejudices of white people towards black people had really declined, as surveys reported, or if they were secretly still in force. Today, the bogus pipeline is still used when trying to measure an individual's affect or attitudes toward certain stimuli.

In this technique, the person whose attitude or emotion is being measured is told that they are being monitored by a machine or a polygraph lie detector, resulting in more truthful answers. The electrodes and wires that are connected to this individual, however, are not activated. Regardless, participants tend to reveal their true feelings and attitudes because they believe they are being monitored and that the real answers will surface regardless of their response. The bogus pipeline can be used to reduce bias because most people do not want to be "second-guessed" by a machine; it is assumed that people would be motivated to choose the "correct" answer so as not to show an incongruence in attitude.

== See also ==
- Randomized response
- Unmatched count
