= Delroy L. Paulhus =

Canadian psychologist

Delroy L. Paulhus is a personality psychology researcher and professor. He received his doctorate from Columbia University and has worked at the University of California, Berkeley and the University of California, Davis. Currently, Paulhus is a professor of psychology at the University of British Columbia in Vancouver, Canada where he teaches undergraduate and graduate courses. He is best known for being the co-creator of the dark triad, along with fellow researcher Kevin Williams.

== Research ==
Since graduating, he has published 150 books, chapters and research articles on a variety of domains such as response styles, self-enhancement, dark personalities, intelligence, social cognition, acculturation, person perception, culture, perceived control, interpersonal capabilities and flexibility, educational measurement, psychological defense, birth order, interpersonal circumplex, altruism, and free will. Novel contributions include the dark triad, everyday sadism, the over-claiming technique, a taxonomy of social desirability scales, spheres of control, and exemplars of intelligence.

== Response styles ==
Paulhus has provided influential reviews of questionnaire response styles such as socially desirable responding (SDR), acquiescence, and extreme responding. (See Paulhus, 1991). With regard to SDR, he framed the distinction between impression management and self-deceptive biases and went on to measure them separately using the BIDR. In later work, he organized SDR in terms of agency and communion. Most recently, Paulhus developed an objective measure of bias using the over-claiming technique.

== Dark personalities ==
Paulhus and Williams (2002) coined the term "dark triad" in referring to three socially aversive personalities: Machiavellianism, narcissism, and psychopathy. The research showed both similarities and differences among the three constructs. Their distinctiveness was confirmed in studies of associations with impulsivity, aggression, body modification, mate choice, sexual deviancy, scholastic cheating, revenge, and the personality of stalkers. A fourth member, everyday sadism, was recently added to the pantheon of dark personalities. Questionnaire measures are available in a chapter by Paulhus and Jones (2015).

== Measures developed ==
Among his most popular scales are the Balanced Inventory of Desirable Responding (BIDR-6), the UBC Word Test, the Self-Report Psychopathy Scale, the Spheres of Control (SOC) inventory, the Free Will & Determinism (FAD) scale, the Short Dark Triad (SD3), and several Over-Claiming Questionnaires (OCQ).
