= Unmatched count =

Technique in psychology and social research

In psychology and social research, unmatched count, item count, or list experiment is a technique to improve, through anonymity, the number of true answers to possibly embarrassing or self-incriminating questions. It is very simple to use but yields only the number of people bearing the property of interest and leads to a larger sampling error than direct questions. It was introduced by D. Raghavarao and Walter T. Federer in 1979.

== Method ==
The participants of the survey are divided into two groups at random. One group, the control group, is given a few harmless questions, while the other group gets an additional question regarding the property of interest. The respondents are to reveal only the number of "yes" answers they have given. Since the interviewer does not know how they arrived at that number, it is safe to answer the awkward question truthfully. Due to the unmatched count of items, the number of people who answered "yes" to the awkward question can be mathematically deduced.

=== Example ===
The control group is asked how many of the following statements apply:

- I have changed my place of residence.
- I own a pet.
- I like to go to the theatre.
- I have never been in a traffic accident.

Let the total number of "yes" answers from this group be 410.

The second group additionally gets a question concerning the point of interest:

- I have cheated on an examination.

Let the total number of "yes" answers from this group be 460.

=== Evaluation ===
The number of "yes" answers in the control group is called the baseline. It is assumed that the second group would have given the same number, were it not for the critical question. Thus, their additional "yes" answers (50 in the example) are due to the critical question. This is used to estimate the percentage of cheaters in the population. Let the number of participants in each group be 300. As expectation value, 50 of them answered "yes" to the critical question, meaning that approximately 17% of the population have cheated on examinations.

== See also ==
- Bogus pipeline
- Randomized response
