= Micromanagement =

Excessive attention or control by a manager

Micromanagement is a management style characterized by behaviors such as an excessive focus on observing and controlling subordinates and an obsession with details.

Micromanagement generally has a negative connotation, suggesting a lack of freedom and trust in the workplace, and an excessive focus on details at the expense of the "big picture" and larger goals.

== Definition ==
Merriam-Webster's online dictionary defines micromanagement as "manage[ment] especially with excessive control or attention on details." The online dictionary Encarta defined micromanagement as "atten[tion] to small details in management: control [of] a person or a situation by paying extreme attention to small details." Dictionary.com defines micromanagement as "manage[ment] or control with excessive attention to minor details." This obsession with the most minute of details causes a direct management failure in the loss of focus on the major details.

== Symptoms ==
Rather than giving general instructions on smaller tasks and then devoting time to supervising larger concerns, the micromanager monitors and assesses every step of a process and avoids delegation of decisions.

It is common for micromanagers, especially those who exhibit narcissistic tendencies and/or micromanage deliberately and for strategic reasons, to delegate work to subordinates and then micromanage those subordinates' performance, enabling the micromanagers in question to both take credit for positive results and shift the blame for negative results to their subordinates. These micromanagers thereby delegate accountability for failure but not the authority to take alternative actions that would have led to success or at least to the mitigation of that failure.

The most extreme cases of micromanagement constitute a management pathology closely related to workplace bullying and narcissistic behavior. Micromanagement resembles addiction in that although most micromanagers are behaviorally dependent on control over others, both as a lifestyle and as a means of maintaining that lifestyle, many of them fail to recognize and acknowledge their dependence even when everyone around them observes it.

Although micromanagers may have good intentions, micromanaging most often arises due to a lack of trust and respect. Some common reasons why people micromanage include:

- Fear of loss of control over projects
- A belief that work deemed superior to their own may make them look inadequate
- Extreme need for control and domination
- Poor self-image and insecurities
- Inexperience in management

== Causes ==
The most frequent motivations for micromanagement are internal and related to the personality of the manager. However, the external factors such as organizational culture may also play a major role. Other factors which can induce micromanagement include the importance of a project and its timeline, with more important work and more demanding deadlines increasing the stakes for the manager in charge.

Micromanagement can also stem from such dynamics as a breakdown in the fundamentals of delegation and lack of trust. When a task or project is delegated in an unclear way, or where a lack of confidence exists between the manager and the person doing the work, both common characteristics of too little management, micromanagement, however, may instead ensue. Preventatives include clear delegation, a well defined goal, and a firm grasp of constraints and dependencies.

== Effects ==
Micromanagement can have profound psychological effects on employees. It often leads to increased stress, anxiety, and a sense of helplessness. Employees may feel undervalued and lose confidence in their abilities. Over time, this can result in burnout and a high turnover rate. Understanding these impacts can help both managers and employees address the root causes of micromanagement.

Stress and Anxiety

When employees are constantly monitored and controlled, it creates a high-stress environment. The fear of making mistakes and the pressure to meet unrealistic expectations can lead to anxiety. This stress can spill over into personal life, affecting overall well-being.

Loss of Confidence

Micromanagement sends a message that the manager does not trust the employee’s abilities. This lack of trust can erode self-confidence and make employees doubt their skills and judgment. Over time, this can lead to a decrease in job satisfaction and motivation.

Burnout

The constant pressure and lack of autonomy can lead to burnout. Employees may feel exhausted, both physically and emotionally, and lose interest in their work. Burnout can result in decreased productivity and increased absenteeism.

It is said that micromanagers may believe that they are ensuring high standards, though the opposite is often true. Constant oversight can slow down processes, as employees wait for approvals and second-guess their decisions. This can lead to missed deadlines and reduced efficiency. A culture of micromanagement can permeate an organization, affecting morale and engagement. Employees may feel demotivated and disengaged, leading to higher turnover rates and difficulty attracting top talent.

== Historical examples ==
=== Robert McNamara ===
Secretary of Defense Robert McNamara's actions during the Cuban Missile Crisis would lead Chief of Naval Operations Admiral George Anderson to accuse him of micromanagement:

I think when you have dominant people like McNamara playing, they throw the whole thing off balance...For example, I sent out a directive to make sure that there were qualified Russian-language officers on each ship involved in the quarantine—in case there had to be interrogations. As CNO, I didn’t go around and personally try to check every ship to find out if a Russian-language officer was on board. After all, I had a four-star, experienced CinC in Admiral [Robert] Dennison, I had a good organization, and I had no thought of saying, “Well, did you carry out my order? Did each one arrive on each ship?” Dennison said he’d get them on there, and that was enough for me. But McNamara wanted me to get into every detail, he wanted me to interrogate each ship as to whether language officers were actually on board. This was an overpreoccupation with detail that I don’t think the civilian authorities should get involved with in a case of this sort.

As a consequence of incidents such as this, McNamara's designation of aircraft 'times-over-targets' [TOTs] (which contributed to their downing), (Note: See Robert McNamara as Secretary of Defense § Downing of Charles Klusmann over Laos for a prime example of micromanagement consequences.) and the White House selection of targets during Operation Rolling Thunder, the U.S. military would attempt to resist civilian micromanagement in future operations.

== See also ==
- Abusive power and control
- Blame in organizations
- Machiavellianism in the workplace
- Narcissism in the workplace
- Narcissistic leadership
- Overparenting
- Outline of management
- Psychopathy in the workplace
- Seagull manager
- Setting up to fail
- Toxic leader
- Toxic workplace
