= Organizational behavior =

Study of human behavior in organizational settings

Organizational behavior or organisational behaviour (see spelling differences) is the "study of human behavior in organizational settings, the interface between human behavior and the organization, and the organization itself". Organizational behavioral research can be categorized in at least three ways:

- individuals in organizations (micro-level)
- work groups (meso-level)
- how organizations behave (macro-level)

Chester Barnard recognized that individuals behave differently when acting in their organizational roles than when acting independently of the organization. Organizational behavior researchers primarily study how individuals behave within these roles. One of the main goals of organizational behavior research is "to revitalize organizational theory and develop a better conceptual understanding of organizational life".

== Relation to industrial and organizational psychology ==
Miner (2006) mentioned that "there is a certain arbitrariness" in identifying a "point at which organizational behavior became established as a distinct discipline" (p. 56), suggesting that it could have emerged in the 1940s or 1950s. He also underlined the fact that the industrial psychology division of the American Psychological Association did not add "organizational" to its name until 1970, "long after organizational behavior had clearly come into existence" (p. 56), noting that a similar situation arose in sociology. Although there are similarities and differences between the two disciplines, there is still confusion around differentiating organizational behavior and organizational psychology.

== History ==
As a multi-disciplinary science, organizational behavior has been influenced by developments in a number of related disciplines, including sociology, industrial/organizational psychology, and economics.

The Industrial Revolution is a period from the 1760s where new technologies resulted in the adoption of new manufacturing techniques and increased mechanization. In his famous iron cage metaphor, Max Weber raised concerns over the reduction in religious and vocational work experiences. Weber claimed that the Industrial Revolution's focus on efficiency constrained the worker to a kind of "prison" and "stripped a worker of their individuality". The significant social and cultural changes caused by the Industrial Revolution also gave rise to new forms of organization. Weber analyzed one of these organizations and came to the conclusion that bureaucracy was "an organization that rested on rational-legal principles and maximized technical efficiency."

A number of organizational behavioral practitioners documented their ideas about management and organization. The best known theories today originate from Henri Fayol, Chester Barnard, and Mary Parker Follet. All three of them drew from their experience to develop a model of effective organizational management, and each of their theories independently shared a focus on human behavior and motivation. One of the first management consultants, Frederick Taylor, was a 19th-century engineer who applied an approach known as the scientific management. Taylor advocated for maximizing task efficiency through the scientific method. The scientific method was further refined by Lillian and Frank Gilbreth, who utilized time and motion study to further improve worker efficiency. In the early 20th century the idea of Fordism emerged. Named after automobile mogul Henry Ford, the method relied on the standardization of production through the use of assembly lines. This allowed unskilled workers to produce complex products efficiently. Sorenson later clarified that Fordism developed independently of Taylor. Fordism can be explained as the application of bureaucratic and scientific management principles to whole manufacturing process. The success of the scientific method and Fordism resulted in the widespread adoption of these methods.

In the 1920s, the Hawthorne Works Western Electric factory commissioned the first of what was to become known as the Hawthorne Studies. These studies initially adhered to the traditional scientific method, but also investigated whether workers would be more productive with higher or lower lighting levels. The results showed that regardless of lighting levels, when workers were being studied, productivity increased, but when the studies ended, worker productivity would return to normal. In following experiments, Elton Mayo concluded that job performance and the so-called Hawthorne Effect was strongly correlated to social relationships and job content. Following the Hawthorne Studies motivation became a focal point in the Organizational behavioral community. A range of theories emerged in the 1950s and 1960s and include theories from notable Organizational behavioral researchers such as: Frederick Herzberg, Abraham Maslow, David McClelland, Victor Vroom, and Douglas McGregor. These theories underline employee motivation, work performance, and job satisfaction.

Herbert Simon's Administrative Behavior introduced a number of important Organizational behavior concepts, most notably decision-making. Simon and Chester Barnard, argued that people make decisions differently inside an organization when compared to their decisions outside of an organization. While classical economic theories assume that people are rational decision-makers, Simon argued a contrary point. He argued that cognition is limited because of bounded rationality For example, decision-makers often employ satisficing, the process of utilizing the first marginally acceptable solution rather than the most optimal solution. Simon was awarded the Nobel Prize in Economics for his work on organizational decision-making. In the 1960s and 1970s, the field started to become more quantitative and resource dependent. This gave rise to contingency theory, institutional theory, and organizational ecology. Starting in the 1980s, cultural explanations of organizations and organizational change became areas of study, in concert with fields such as anthropology, psychology and sociology.

== Current state of the field ==
Research in and the teaching of Organizational behavior primarily takes place in university management departments in colleges of business. Sometimes Organizational Behavioral topics are taught in industrial and organizational psychology graduate programs.

There have been additional developments in Organizational behavior research and practice. Anthropology has become increasingly influential, and led to the idea that one can understand firms as communities, by introducing concepts such as organizational culture, organizational rituals, and symbolic acts. Leadership studies have also become part of Organizational behavior, although a single unifying theory remains elusive. Organizational behavioral researchers have shown increased interest in ethics and its importance in an organization. Some Organizational behavioral researchers have become interested in the aesthetic sphere of organizations.

== Research methods used ==
A variety of methods are used in organizational behavior, many of which are found in other social sciences.

=== Quantitative methods ===
Quantitative research allows organizational behavior to be studied/compared through numerical data. A key advantage of quantitative studies is that their efficient examinations of large groups can be studied at lower costs and in less time. This form of research studies more of the broad study.

Statistical methods used in OB research commonly include correlation, analysis of variance, meta-analysis, multilevel modeling, multiple regression, structural equation modeling, and time series analysis

=== Computer simulation ===
Computer simulation is a prominent method in organizational behavior. While there are many uses for computer simulation, most Organizational behavioral researchers have used computer simulation to understand how organizations or firms operate. More recently, however, researchers have also started to apply computer simulation to understand individual behavior at a micro-level, focusing on individual and interpersonal cognition and behavior such as the thought processes and behaviors that make up teamwork.

=== Qualitative methods ===
Qualitative research consists of several methods of inquiry that generally do not involve the quantification of variables.This procedure builds and structure patterns of individual behavior. An advantage of qualitative research is that it provides a clearer picture of an organization. Qualitative methods can range from the content analysis of interviews or written material to written narratives of observations. Meaning that qualitative research goes more in depth of their studies as opposed to the entirety. Common methods include ethnography, case studies, historical methods, and interviews.

== Topics ==
=== Consulting ===
Consultants apply organizational behavior research to assess organizational problems of clients and develop effective recommendations. Understanding the consultant-client relationship is important for the success of any consulting engagement.

=== Counterproductive work behavior ===
Counterproductive work behavior is employee behavior that harms or intends to harm an organization.

=== Decision-making ===
Many Organizational behavior researchers embrace the rational planning model. Decision-making research often focuses on how decisions are ordinarily made (normative decision-making), how thinkers arrive at a particular judgement (descriptive decision-making), and how to improve this decision-making (descriptive decision-making).

=== Effects of diversity and inclusion ===
Companies that focus on diversity and inclusion are able to benefit from advantages such as better retention and less intention by staff to quit, increased job satisfaction, lower levels of stress and job withdrawal, higher levels of creativity and innovation, as well as less on-the-job conflict. Diversity, or focusing on differences between individuals and groups is of course important, organizations that have a culture that values the unique perspectives and contributions of all employees, also known as inclusion, may be able to move the needle from not engaged to engaged.

=== Employee mistreatment ===
There are several types of mistreatments that employees endure in organizations, including: Abusive supervision, bullying, incivility, and sexual harassment. Employees in an organization being mistreated also can suffer work withdrawal. Withdrawing from an organization can be in the form of being late, not fully participating in work duties, or looking for a new job. Employees may file grievances in an organization with retrospect to a procedure or policy or mistreatment with human interactions.

==== Abusive supervision ====
Abusive supervision is the extent to which a supervisor engages in a pattern of behavior that harms subordinates.

==== Bullying ====
Although definitions of workplace bullying vary, it involves a repeated pattern of harmful behaviors directed towards an individual. In order for a behavior to be termed bullying, the individual or individuals doing the harm have to possess (either singly or jointly) more power on any level than the victim.

==== Incivility ====
Workplace incivility consists of low-intensity discourteous and rude behavior and is characterized by an ambiguous intent to harm, and the violation of social norms governing appropriate workplace behavior.

==== Sexual harassment ====
Sexual harassment is behavior that denigrates or mistreats individuals on account of their gender, often creating an offensive workplace that interferes with job performance.

=== Job-related attitudes and emotions ===
Organizational behavior deals with employee attitudes and feelings, including job satisfaction, organizational commitment, job involvement and emotional labor. Job satisfaction reflects employees' feelings about their job or facets of the job, such as pay or supervision. Organizational commitment represents the extent to which employees feel attached to their organization. Job involvement is the extent to which an individual identifies with their job and considers it a material component of their self-worth. Emotional labor concerns the requirement that an employee display certain emotions, such smiling at customers, even when the employee does not feel the emotion he or she is required to display.

=== Leadership ===
There have been a number of theories that concern leadership. Early theories focused on characteristics of leaders, while later theories focused on leader behavior, and conditions under which leaders can be effective. Among these approaches are contingency theory, the consideration and initiating structure model, leader-member exchange or LMX theory, path-goal theory, behavioural modification and transformational leadership theory.

Contingency theory indicates that good leadership depends on characteristics of the leader and the situation. The Ohio State Leadership Studies identified dimensions of leadership known as consideration (showing concern and respect for subordinates) and initiating structure (assigning tasks and setting performance goals). LMX theory focuses on exchange relationships between individual supervisor-subordinate pairs. Path-goal theory is a contingency theory linking appropriate leader style to organizational conditions and subordinate personality. Transformational leadership theory concerns the behaviors leaders engage in that inspire high levels of motivation and performance in followers. The idea of charismatic leadership is part of transformational leadership theory. In behavioural modification, the leader's reward power (ability to give or withhold reward and punishment) is the focus and the importance of giving contingent (vs non-contingent) rewards is emphasized.

=== Managerial roles ===
In the late 1960s Henry Mintzberg, a graduate student at MIT, carefully studied the activities of five executives. On the basis of his observations, Mintzberg arrived at three categories that subsume managerial roles: interpersonal roles, decisional roles, and informational roles.

=== Motivation ===
Retaining talented and successful employees is a key factor for a company to maintain a competitive advantage. An environment where people can use their talent effectively can help motivate even the most smart, hard-working, difficult individuals. Building great people relies on engagement through motivation and behavioral practices (O'Reilly, C., and Pfeffer, J., 2000). Baron and Greenberg (2008) wrote that motivation involves "the set of processes that arouse, direct, and maintain human behavior toward attaining some goal." There are several different theories of motivation relevant to Organizational Behavior, including equity theory, expectancy theory, Maslow's hierarchy of needs, incentive theory, organizational justice theory, Herzberg's two-factor theory, and Theory X and Theory Y.

=== Types of motivation ===
Intrinsic Motivation- This behavior happens out of the pure thought of an individual's need. Not as compensation. This behavior is used out of the pure need of self-motivation. It is the need to prove one's self worth. Extrinsic motivation is triggered by external rewards. Meaning, the need for a reward outside of themselves feeling accomplished. This can be brought to them by a pay raise, bonuses, rewards like gift cards and many other sorts.

=== Public Relations ===
Public relations is the practice of managing the communication between the public and the organization, therefore public relations is also related to organizational behavior.

=== National culture ===
National culture is thought to affect the behavior of individuals in organizations. This idea is exemplified by Hofstede's cultural dimensions theory. Hofstede surveyed a large number of cultures and identified six dimensions of national cultures that influence the behavior of individuals in organizations. These dimensions include power distance, individualism vs. collectivism, uncertainty avoidance, masculinity vs. femininity, long-term orientation vs. short term orientation, and indulgence vs. restraint.

=== Organizational behavior policies ===
Organizational behavior policies inside organizations such as employee dating, are rules that can be applied to employees with fairness. Labor relations, leadership, diversity and inclusion policies, will have more satisfied employees with organizational behavior policies. Policy implications are underutilized in organizations. But the need for implications is important.

=== Organizational citizenship behavior ===
Organizational citizenship behavior is behavior that goes beyond assigned tasks and contributes to the well-being of organizations.

=== Organizational culture ===
Organizational culture reflects the values and behaviors that are commonly observed in an organization. Investigators who pursue this line of research assume that organizations can be characterized by cultural dimensions such as beliefs, values, rituals, symbols, and so forth. Researchers have developed models for understanding an organization's culture or developed typologies of organizational culture. Edgar Schein developed a model for understanding organizational culture. He identified three levels of organizational culture: (a) artifacts and behaviors, (b) espoused values, and (c) shared basic assumptions. Specific cultures have been related to organizational performance and effectiveness.

=== Personality ===
Personality concerns consistent patterns of behavior, cognition, and emotion in individuals. The study of personality in organizations has generally focused on the relation of specific traits to employee performance. There has been a particular focus on the Big Five personality traits, which refers to five overarching personality traits.

=== Occupational stress ===
There are number of ways to characterize occupational stress. One way of characterizing it is to term it an imbalance between job demands (aspects of the job that require mental or physical effort) and resources that help manage the demands.

=== Work–family conflict ===
Chester Barnard recognized that individuals behave differently when acting in their work role than when acting in roles outside their work role. Work–family conflict occurs when the demands of family and work roles are incompatible, and the demands of at least one role interfere with the discharge of the demands of the other.

== Organization theory ==
Organization theory is concerned with explaining the workings of an organization as a whole or of many organizations. The focus of organizational theory is to understand the structure and processes of organizations and how organizations interact with each other and the larger society.

=== Bureaucracy ===
Max Weber argued that bureaucracy involved the application of rational-legal authority to the organization of work, making bureaucracy the most technically efficient form of organization. Weber enumerated a number of principles of bureaucratic organization including: a formal organizational hierarchy, management by rules, organization by functional specialty, selecting people based on their skills and technical qualifications, an "up-focused" (to organization's board or shareholders) or "in-focused" (to the organization itself) mission, and a purposefully impersonal environment (e.g., applying the same rules and structures to all members of the organization). These rules reflect Weberian "ideal types," and how they are enacted in organizations varies according to local conditions. Charles Perrow extended Weber's work, arguing that all organizations can be understood in terms of bureaucracy and that organizational failures are more often a result of insufficient application of bureaucratic principles.

=== Economic theories of organization ===
At least three theories are relevant here, theory of the firm, transaction cost economics, and agency theory.

=== Theories pertaining to organizational structures ===
Theories pertaining to organizational structures and dynamics include complexity theory, French and Raven's five bases of power, hybrid organization theory, informal organizational theory, resource dependence theory, and Mintzberg's organigraph.

=== Systems theory ===
The systems framework is also fundamental to organizational theory. Organizations are complex, goal-oriented entities. Alexander Bogdanov, an early thinker in the field, developed his tectology, a theory widely considered a precursor of Bertalanffy's general systems theory. One of the aims of general systems theory was to model human organizations. Kurt Lewin, a social psychologist, was influential in developing a systems perspective with regard to organizations. He coined the term "systems of ideology," partly based on his frustration with behaviorist psychology, which he believed to be an obstacle to sustainable work in psychology. Niklas Luhmann, a sociologist, developed a sociological systems theory.

=== Organizational ecology ===
Organizational ecology models apply concepts from evolutionary theory to the study of populations of organizations, focusing on birth (founding), growth and change, and death (firm mortality). In this view, organizations are 'selected' based on their fit with their operating environment.

=== Scientific management ===
Scientific management refers to an approach to management based on principles of engineering. It focuses on incentives and other practices empirically shown to improve productivity.

== Contributing disciplines ==
- Anthropology
- Human resources management
- Industrial/organizational psychology
- Personality psychology
- Social psychology
- Sociology

== Models ==
=== Inputs-Processes-Outputs (IPO) framework ===
==== Inputs ====
Inputs are the variables like personality, group structure, and organization culture that lead to processes. These variables set the stage for what will occur in an organization later.

==== Processes ====
Processes are actions that individuals, groups, and organisations engage in as a result of inputs and that lead to certain outcomes.

==== Outcomes ====
Outcomes are the key variables that you want to explain or predict, and that are affected by some other variables.

=== Inputs-Mediators-Outputs-Inputs (IMOI) framework ===
Adding to the IPO model, the IMOI framework emphasizes that outputs can also become subsequent inputs, creating a cyclical process.

== Journals ==
- Academy of Management Journal
- Academy of Management Review
- Administrative Science Quarterly
- Harvard Business Review
- Human Resource Management
- Human Resources Management Review
- Journal of Business and Psychology
- Journal of International Business Studies
- Journal of Management
- Journal of Management Studies
- Organizational Behavior and Human Decision Processes
- Organization Science
- Organization Studies
- Organizational Research Methods
- Sloan Management Review
- Systems Research and Behavioral Science

== See also ==
- Fail fast (business) – Business management concept
- Kick the cat – Metaphor about frustration within an organization
- Kiss up kick down – Form of social malfunction
- List of business theorists
- Machiavellianism in the workplace – Concept in organizational psychology
- Marking your own homework
- Narcissism in the workplace – Problem producing an impact on an organization
- Occupational health psychology – Health and Safety psychology
- Organization design
- Organization development – Study and implementation of techniques that affect organizational change
- Organizational dissent
- Organizational engineering
- Organizational studies
- Psychopathy in the workplace – Prevalence of psychopathy in organizations
