= MACH-IV (test) =

Personality psychometric

The MACH-IV is a 20 question self-report Likert scale psychometric designed to test levels of Machiavellianism in individuals. In personality psychology, Machiavellianism refers to a personality construct which comprises manipulativeness, deceitfulness, and a callous, calculating orientation. It is the most widely used Machiavellianism test by researchers.

== Background ==
Social psychologist Richard Christie was interested in the motivations and underlying personality traits of manipulators. He proposed that they had certain characteristics that made them more willing to take advantage of others, such as having a lack of affect and empathy in interpersonal dealings, and a lack of concern for morality. He viewed Machiavelli as a source to gain ideas from and eventually wrote test items that were loosely based on his general writing style. He and his research partner Florence Geis published their results in the book "Studies in Machiavellianism" in 1970.

== Factors ==
The MACH-IV has 20 items, all which are designed to tap into the following factors: "Views", "Tactics", and "Morality". The "Views" factor is related to beliefs that are self interested and cynical, the "Tactics" factor focuses on the endorsement of manipulation as a means to take advantage of others, and the "Morality" factor deals with one's adherence to moral scruple.

=== Items ===
Items featured on the test include statements that the respondent rates on a scale from "disagree" to "agree", such as "most people who get ahead in the world lead clean, moral lives" and "P.T. Barnum was wrong when he said that there's a sucker born every minute" (which is often misattributed to Barnum).

=== High vs low scorers ===
Those who score high are classified as High Machs, while those who score low are classified as Low Machs. High scorers were more likely to win experimental games by deceiving the other person, while low Machs tried playing by the rules of the experiment. Overall, High Machs are more likely to be manipulative, exploitative, and callous, while Low Machs are the opposite, viewing others in more of an empathetic viewpoint. Research has consistently shown that men score higher than women in Machiavellianism.

== Other MACH tests ==
While the MACH-IV is the most utilized scale for Machiavellianism, there have been other tests which predate and postdate the Mach IV. The MACH V was created to address criticisms given to the MACH IV, but it is no longer used due to psychometric issues, such as poor validity. According to psychologists, the Mach V suffered from "scoring problems, low internal consistency, and the underlying factor structure is not as clear as that of the Mach IV".

=== Kiddie Mach ===
The Kiddie Mach is a variant of the MACH test, but for children. The test features questions simple enough for a child to understand, such as "the best way to get along with people is to tell them things that make them happy". The Kiddie Mach features 20 questions, similar to the regular MACH-IV. High scores on the Kiddie Mach were negatively correlated with the Basic Empathy Scale. Children who score high on the Kiddie Mach also score low on other empathy scales. Studies have reported internal consistency reliability coefficients ranging from 0.70 to 0.76 for the Mach IV scale. The Kiddie Mach Scale, however, demonstrated lower internal reliability, with coefficients between 0.60 and 0.70. Via studies on Machiavellianism in children, it was found that the trait is influenced by both genetics and the environment (especially the shared environment). In studies it was shown that high scorers on the Kiddie Mach had a better time detecting when their opponent was lying and when they told the truth. They were also able to conceal their deception when playing a bluffing game. High scorers were also able to convince their peers to eat quinine flavored crackers and used deceit to get various rewards.

=== Five Factor Machiavellianism Inventory (FFMI) ===
In theory, Machiavellianism is stated to be different from psychopathy because of potential levels of conscientiousness (the quality of being organized and careful). However, empirical tests don't show this difference, and in actuality they measure Machiavellianism as including low conscientiousness.

Research by Katherine Collison and others aimed to develop a better way to measure Machiavellianism that matches theoretical understanding. The researchers started by asking experts to describe Machiavellianism using 30 specific personality traits from the five-factor model of personality. The experts identified 13 key traits, notably low agreeableness (being uncooperative) and high conscientiousness.

The researchers then created a questionnaire called the Five Factor Machiavellianism Inventory (FFMI), starting with 201 questions based on these traits. They tested it in two studies with 710 people from Amazon's Mechanical Turk platform. They shortened the questionnaire to 52 questions and confirmed it worked well by comparing it to other established measures of personality, including the Big Five traits, existing Machiavellianism tests, psychopathy, narcissism, ambition, and impulsivity. The results suggest this new FFMI test could be a possible tool for measuring Machiavellianism. The FFMI displayed positive correlations with a range of criteria for vocational and work-related success and was shown to be distinct from psychopathy.

=== Machiavellian Personality Scale (MPS) ===
Dahling, Whitaker, and Levy (2009) developed the Machiavellian Personality Scale (MPS) to address the shortcomings of the original MACH-IV. However, reliability issues arose with the MPS, the same ones that historically have been associated with the Mach IV.

== Validity and criticism ==
There have been questions raised as to the validity of the MACH-IV. Because of this MACH-IV has been the subject of criticism by researchers over the years. One such criticism is that the test does not measure anything different from narcissism and psychopathy. John McHoskey even stated that the MACH-IV could be used to evaluate psychopathy in a non-criminal population. It has also come under criticism for simply being outdated. For example, Daniel Jones has stated that the scale, while it is commendable in many ways, is "not helping the field with precision". He ultimately states that it "should be replaced by assessments that are more precise reflections of the construct." John Rauthmann and others have stated that, while the MACH-IV is "a generally reliable and valid scale", it has its shortcomings. These include the response styles of the test takers, the varying factor structures, the scale merely being a measure of cynicism only and "insufficient content and construct validity". The researchers developed their own scale instead to study Machiavellianism multidimensionally instead of unidimensionally to prevent the construct from becoming hard to study effectively. Psychologist Jason Dahling and others have created another measure of Machiavellianism, dubbed the Machiavellian Personality Scale (or MPS for short). Scholars point out that while the construct is named after Machiavelli, the scale is not related to him outside of bearing his name, and that his political ideas are irrelevant.

== See also ==
- Dark Triad Dirty Dozen
- Machiavellianism in the workplace
- Psychopathic Personality Inventory
- Narcissistic Personality Inventory
- Light triad
