= Likert =

Likert may refer to:

- Rensis Likert (1903–1981), American educator and organizational psychologist best known for his research on management styles
- Likert scale, a psychometric measurement scale developed by Rensis Likert
- Likert's management systems, styles of management developed by Rensis Likert
