= Machiavellianism =

Machiavellianism may refer to:

- Machiavellianism (politics), the political philosophy of Niccolò Machiavelli, usually associated with various forms of political realism.
- Machiavellianism (psychology), a scale in personality psychology that measures one's cold affect and manipulative orientation.
  - Machiavellianism in the workplace
  - Studies in Machiavellianism, 1970 psychology book by Richard Christie and Florence Geis

== See also ==
- The Machiavellian Moment, book by John G. A. Pocock- an analysis of Machiavelli's influence after his death.
- Machiavellian intelligence hypothesis, concept in primatology that deals with a primate's ability to be in a successful social engagement with other groups
- Machiavellian (horse), 1987–2004, an American racehorse
