= Completed staff work =

Management principle

Completed staff work is a principle of management which states that subordinates are responsible for submitting written recommendations to superiors in such a manner that the superior needs to do nothing further in the process other than to review the submitted document and indicate approval or disapproval.

In Completed Staff Work, the subordinate is responsible for identifying the problem or issue requiring decision by some higher authority. In written form such as a memorandum, the subordinate documents the research done, the facts gathered, and analysis made of alternative courses of action. The memo concludes with a specific recommendation for action by the superior.

The earliest description of the concept of Completed Staff Work appears in U.S. Army publications. Since its early military origin, it has subsequently found favor in police management texts in the U.S.

James Webb, Director of the Bureau of the Budget (1946-1949), attributes the Doctrine of Completed Staff Work to President Harry S. Truman. However, a memo written and circulated by Brigadier General George A. Rehm, executive officer for the G-3, Operations section, attributes the policy to General MacArthur's headquarters in the Southwest Pacific Areas during World War II.

== See also ==
- Organizational behavior
