= Maccoby =

Maccoby is a surname. Notable people with the surname include:

- Eleanor Maccoby (1917–2018), American psychologist
- Hyam Maccoby (1924–2004), British scholar and historian
- Michael Maccoby (1933–2022), American psychoanalyst and anthropologist
