= Randall S. Peterson =

- Scientific career
- Fields: Organisational Behaviour
- Workplaces: London Business School
- Website: randallspeterson.com

Randall Scott Peterson is a professor of Organisational Behaviour and Academic Director of the Leadership Institute at London Business School.

== Biography ==
He received a B.S. in agricultural education, animal science, and agricultural economics in 1986 and then an MA in educational psychology from University of Minnesota, Twin Cities, and then received a Ph.D. in psychology in 1995 from University of California, Berkeley, with a thesis "A directive leadership style can be both virtue and vice: evidence from elite and experimental groups" He then took a position as assistant professor, Northwestern University (1995–97), followed by positions of assistant and then associate professor at Cornell University. He came to London Business School in 2001 as associate professor, and was promoted to full professor in 2005.

== Research ==
Peterson is an academic in the field of leadership and organisational behavior where his research focuses on the interpersonal dynamics of senior management in team interactions. Peterson is Chair of the Organisational Behaviour Subject Area and Vice President of the School's Campaign Committee.

== Selected works ==
=== Books ===
- Day, Randal D.; Peterson, Randall S.; Mannix, Elizabeth A. (2014). Leading and Managing People in the Dynamic Organization. New York: Psychology Press, 2013. ISBN 0805843620

=== Most cited peer-reviewed papers ===
- TL Simons, RS Peterson Task conflict and relationship conflict in top management teams: The pivotal role of intragroup trust. Journal of applied psychology 2000 85 (1), 102 According to Google Scholar, has been 1901 cited times
- Earley PC, Peterson RS. The elusive cultural chameleon: Cultural intelligence as a new approach to intercultural training for the global manager. Academy of Management Learning & Education. 2004 Mar 1;3(1):100-15. According to Goggle Scholar, has been cited 739 times
- Peterson RS, Smith DB, Martorana PV, Owens PD. The impact of chief executive officer personality on top management team dynamics: one mechanism by which leadership affects organizational performance. Journal of Applied Psychology. 2003 Oct;88(5):795. According to Goggle Scholar, has been cited 641 times
- Peterson RS, Behfar KJ. The dynamic relationship between performance feedback, trust, and conflict in groups: A longitudinal study. Organizational behavior and human decision processes. 2003 Sep 1;92(1–2):102-12. According to Goggle Scholar, has been cited 396 times
- Behfar KJ, Peterson RS, Mannix EA, Trochim WM. The critical role of conflict resolution in teams: A close look at the links between conflict type, conflict management strategies, and team outcomes. Journal of applied psychology. 2008 Jan;93(1):170. According to Goggle Scholar, has been cited 416 times
