= Organizational engineering =

Organizational engineering (OE) is a form of organizational development. It was created by Gary Salton of Professional Communications, Inc. It has been developing continuously since 1994 on both theoretical and applied levels.

The core premise of OE is that humans are information-processing organisms. It posits that individual behavior can be understood and predicted using engineering's basic model of:

INPUT > PROCESS > OUTPUT

This offers advantages over the more typical psychological approaches. Primary among these is that it requires only simple logic. There is no need to rely on unseen forces or "inherent" mental characteristics.

For example, life requires a person to navigate a host of relationships with people and things. People's lives tend to be relatively stable. They live in the same house, drive the same car, put the same children to bed in the evening and go to work to the same place each morning. This stability allows people to perfect a strategy that works in their typical situations. Since people tend to reuse things that work, this strategy becomes their general approach. They will try to use it even in unfamiliar situations. It becomes a characteristic approach.

OE calls the strategies people regularly use strategic styles. Styles are different combinations of the Input>Process>Output. Each mix produces a different but predictable pattern of behavior. For example, a person may elect to pay attention to detail (input). It is virtually certain that this will slow response. The more detail they require, the slower they will be. Others will probably infer that they are cautious or deliberate. This result is a certainty. It takes time to process information. Unless a way can be found to speed the chemical reactions between the neurons in the brain the result will always be the same.

OE applies the same kind of logic to define the range of possible behaviors. These relationships have been codified under the name of "I Opt." This is an acronym for "Input Output Processing Template". It is the basic measuring tool of Organizational Engineering.

== Tools for individuals ==
The "I Opt" model uses a 24-statement survey to assess preferences. The survey is designed in a way that creates ratio measurement (exact, like a ruler). This contrasts more typical ordinal measurement (e.g., rank ordered – big-bigger-biggest or none-some-lots) used by most other tools. Exact measurement allows "I Opt" to derive formulas that can be used by a computer. Interpretation is unnecessary. The computer can provide a definitive answer.

Information processing is involved in almost every part of a person's life. This means that individual reports can be generated on a variety of interest areas. Standard computer programs in areas like learning, sales, leadership, change management and career direction are available. Additional reports can be programmed as the need for them becomes visible.

== Tools for groups ==
Exact measurement allows "I Opt" infer probable outcomes embedded in a relationship of groups of people. For example, a person might prefer to rely on analysis to make decisions. Another might prefer spontaneous action. Both of these postures use different Input>Process>Output combinations. Both strategies will work to resolve issues. But the strategy of one forecloses the strategy of the other. It is predictable that there will be tension in the relationship. This requires no "interpretation". The direction and degree of tension can be calculated from the strength of the "I Opt" scores of each person.

Organizational engineering uses sociology—the science of groups—as its scaffold. The principles of sociology allow OE to extend its reach. Computer programs can analyze groups of 20 or more people all interacting simultaneously. There is no need to interview group participants. Everything is embedded in the numbers.

Sociology guides interpretation. Computer programs have been created to apply its principles to common situations. For example, TeamAnalysis analyzes groups assuming that everyone has equal power. It reveals the macro-dynamics that underlie group behavior. These become the basis of the advice the computer offers. The LeaderAnalysis takes the next step. It looks at a group and each person in the group from the viewpoint of the leader. It analyzes the leader-group match and produces specific counsel for the leader to consider in guiding the group.

"I Opt" models view groups as a system of relationships. In a system if you change a relationship you change system performance. No individual in the group has to change. Just their relationship to others in the group. It is hard to change people. It is relatively easy to change relationships. This means that the benefits can accrue quickly and will typically increase over time as the interaction patterns are refined.

== Tools for firms ==
Firms are systems of groups. The output of the "I Opt" can be used to assess entire firms. This level of analysis uses the "I Opt" individual and group analytical components as investigatory tools.

The influence of groups upon groups is measured using the tools of practical geometry. The composite profiles of groups are overlaid. The magnitude and direction of overlaps are calculated. Likely outcomes of interactions are inferred. These are the macro-behavioral tendencies of the system of groups. It describes what will happen if the groups are allowed to interact without consistent guidance.

OE sees individual leaders as lynch pins between groups. This follows the Rensis Likert's concept of the linking pin model. The leader represents the group that he/she leads when that leader is participating in larger groups. Leaders also act as a corridor carrying information from the larger group back to their local one. The leader's "I Opt" profile will determine their understanding of the issues. It will also determine the likely actions that they will take.

The predictable behaviors of groups and leaders allow OE to plot likely outcomes. The same principles that apply to teams apply to firms. Change the relationships and you will change the outcomes. "I Opt" can define "what is causing what" in the system of groups and leaders. This allows it to pinpoint critical areas. This ability to focus on points of maximum effect reduces the cost and improves the timeliness of change.

The durable interaction of leaders and groups evolve into a corporate culture. The overlap of the composite profiles defines common perspectives. This is a basis of the "shared" values, beliefs and behaviors that define a culture. Alter the relationships of the groups and/or leaders and corporate culture can be changed in any direction desired.

== Applications ==
Consultants and internal groups within firms use OE and "I Opt" in a variety of ways. Improving team performance is a common use. The reports are easy to read, respectful in tone and mature in content. The non-judgmental nature of the reports means they can be and are used from the Board of Directors to factory floor work groups with equal positive effect.

The various "I Opt" individual analyzes are used as a component of educational programs in areas like leadership development, learning and career guidance. They are also used to facilitate education itself. For example, the TwoPerson Analysis is used as a tool to quickly launch mentoring relationships. Participants know each other's bias form the onset. They can compensate immediately rather than spending time "discovering" these in each other.

Another area of application is in the selection of people to fill specific roles. "I Opt" analysis can predict the relationship of an individual to both the leader and other group members. Taken in conjunction with other measures (e.g., competencies, experience, education, etc.) it can reduce the probability of inappropriate placements.

Overall, organizational engineering gives a way to understand, measure, predict and guide human behavior for both individuals and groups. Its objective is to produce visible, positive results of significant consequence and magnitude. It is able to consistently accomplish this objective in any situation that meets the mutual dependency criteria characteristic of goal directed organizations. This has been demonstrated in domestic and international contexts.

"I Opt" can be used with confidence. The measurement component of "I Opt" has been fully validated. It requires only a 6th-grade reading level to complete the required survey. The individual reports are written at an 8th-grade level. Group reports vary by the complexity of the group being assessed but typically require less than a 12th-grade level reading level.

== Publications ==
The methods, tools and processes employed by OE have been documented in the books Organizational Engineering (Salton, 1996) and the Managers' Guide to Organizational Engineering (Salton, 2000).

The "I Opt" instrumentation has been validated across all eight validity dimensions in the book Validation of Organizational Engineering (Soltysik, 2000). These books are available from Professional Communications Inc.

Recent topics in OE are documented in the Journal of Organizational Engineering. For example, three successive issues outline the origin and methods of control of Corporate Culture. These publications are available for free on the oeinstitute.org website.

Salton periodically holds seminars in Ann Arbor, Michigan, that cover the theory and application of organizational engineering in depth. The seminars are typically restricted to 10 people and some experience with OE technology is preferred but not required.
