= Michigan Studies of Leadership =

Academic study series

The Michigan Leadership Studies were the well-known series of leadership studies commenced at the University of Michigan in the 1950s by Rensis Likert, with the objective of identifying the principles and types of leadership styles that led to greater productivity and enhanced job satisfaction among workers. The studies identified two broad leadership styles – an employee orientation and a production orientation. They also identified three critical characteristics of effective leaders – task-oriented behavior, relationship-oriented behavior and participative leadership. The studies concluded that an employee orientation rather than a production orientation, coupled with general instead of close supervision, led to better results. The Michigan leadership studies, along with the Ohio State University studies that took place in the 1940s, are two of the best-known behavioral leadership studies and continue to be cited to this day. These theories attempt to isolate behaviours that differentiate effective leaders from ineffective leaders. Behavioural studies focus on identifying critical behavioural determinants of leadership that, in turn, could be used to train people to become leaders.

== See also ==
- Industrial and organizational psychology
- Organizational studies
- Leadership
- Charisma
- Trait leadership or trait theory
- Likert's management systems
