= Strategic intelligence =

Intelligence that is required for forming national-level policy and military plans

Strategic intelligence (STRATINT) pertains to the collection, processing, analysis, and dissemination of intelligence that is required for forming policy and military plans at the national and international level. Much of the information needed for strategic reflections comes from Open Source Intelligence. Other sources include traditional HUMINT (especially in recent years), Signals intelligence including ELINT, MASINT which overlaps with SIGINT/ELINT to some degree, and 'National technical means of verification' (e.g. spysats). The father of intelligence analysis and of the strategic intelligence concept was Sherman Kent, in his seminal work Strategic Intelligence for American World Policy, first published in 1949. For Kent, strategic intelligence is ”the knowledge upon which our nation's foreign relations, in war and peace, must rest".

Strategic intelligence pertains to the following system of abilities that, according to Michael Maccoby, characterize some of the most successful leaders in business, government and military.:

- foresight, the ability to understand trends that present threats or opportunities for an organization;
- visioning, the ability to conceptualize an ideal future state based on foresight and create a process to engage others to implement it;
- system thinking, the ability to perceive, synthesize, and integrate elements that function as a whole to achieve a common purpose.
- motivating, the ability to motivate different people to work together to implement a vision. Understanding what motivates people is based upon another ability, personality intelligence.
- partnering, the ability to develop strategic alliances with individuals, groups and organizations. This quality also depends on personality intelligence.

In "Transforming Health Care Leadership, A Systems Guide to Improve Patient Care, Decrease Costs, and Improve Population Health," Jossey Bass, 2013, Maccoby and his co-authors Clifford L. Norman, C. Jane Norman, and Richard Margolies apply strategic intelligence to health care leadership and add to strategic intelligence leadership philosophy and W. Edwards Deming's four elements of "profound Knowledge": understanding variation, systems thinking, understanding personality, and understanding knowledge creation. The concept is further developed and applied in Michael Maccoby, "Strategic Intelligence, Conceptual Tools for Leading Change," Oxford University Press, 2015.

Recent thought leadership on strategic intelligence focuses on the consequences of the modern information age, which has led to the availability of substantial volumes of information than previously encountered. Alfred Rolington, the former CEO of Jane's Information Group and Oxford Analytica, recommends that intelligence organizations approach the challenges of the modern information age by breaking from their traditional models to become more deeply and continuously inter-linked. Specifically, Mr. Rolington advocates more fluid, networked operating methods that incorporates greater open-sourced information and data in analysis.
