= Scott Barry Kaufman =

American psychologist

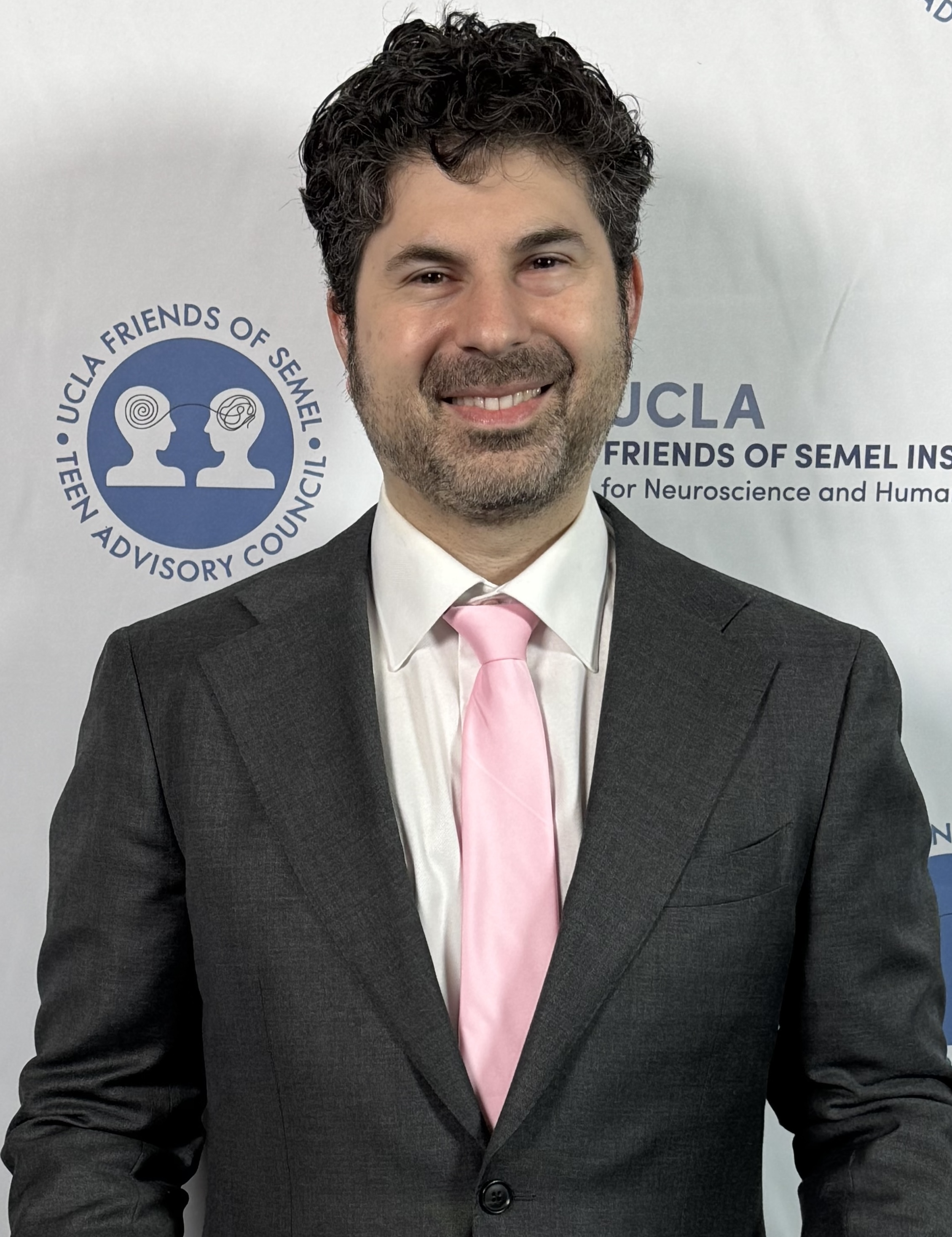
- Kaufman in 2026
- Born: Penn Wynne, Pennsylvania, U.S.
- Education: Carnegie Mellon University (BS); King's College, Cambridge (MPhil); Yale University (PhD)
- Scientific career
- Fields: Humanistic psychology Positive psychology Cognitive science Educational psychology
- Workplaces: Columbia University; Barnard College; New York University; University of Pennsylvania
- Website: www.scottbarrykaufman.com

Scott Barry Kaufman is an American cognitive scientist, author, podcaster, coach, popular science writer, and mentalist. His writing and research focuses on intelligence, creativity, and human potential. Most media attention has focused on Kaufman's attempt to redefine intelligence. Kaufman is founder and director of the Center for Human Potential and has taught courses at Columbia, NYU, the University of Pennsylvania, and elsewhere.

From 2014 to 2025, Kaufman hosted The Psychology Podcast, which relaunched in 2026 as Human Potential Lab. Since 2008 he has written "Beautiful Minds," first as a blog at Psychology Today and Scientific American, and now as a newsletter on Substack. He is the author or editor of numerous books, including Ungifted: Intelligence Redefined (2013), Wired to Create (2015), Transcend: The New Science of Self-Actualization (2020), and Rise Above (2025). He also performs as a mentalist under the stage name "The Amazing Dr. Scott".

== Early life ==
Kaufman grew up in Pennsylvania. As a young child he experienced a series of ear infections and was diagnosed with central auditory processing disorder, which made it difficult for him to process spoken language in real time. He was held back in third grade and placed in special education classes for several years. In ninth grade, a special education teacher questioned why he was still in the program, an encounter Kaufman has credited with prompting him to take on more challenging coursework. He went on to earn high grades in high school; although his earlier IQ scores had not qualified him for his school's gifted program, a teacher allowed him to take gifted classes. Kaufman has said these experiences shaped his later research on intelligence and his critique of how it is measured, themes he developed in his 2013 book Ungifted: Intelligence Redefined.

== Education ==
Kaufman received his B.S. from Carnegie Mellon University, where he double majored in psychology and human-computer interaction, and where he was Herbert A. Simon's last research assistant and a student of Randy Pausch. In 2005, he received his M.Phil. from King's College, Cambridge under a Gates Scholarship, where he worked with Nicholas Mackintosh. After Cambridge, Kaufman earned his Ph.D. in cognitive psychology from Yale University where he was mentored by Robert Sternberg, Jeremy R. Gray, and Jerome L. Singer. From 2009-2010, he was a postdoctoral fellow at the Center Leo Apostel for Interdisciplinary Studies.

== Research ==
=== Gifted education and twice exceptionality ===
Much of Kaufman's work concerns the identification and education of gifted and twice exceptional students, a focus he has connected to his own schooling: he was placed in special education classes as a child and has said his early IQ scores did not qualify him for gifted programs, before he went on to earn graduate degrees at Cambridge and Yale. In Ungifted: Intelligence Redefined (2013), he argued that intelligence and ability are dynamic—developing through the interaction of engagement and ability over time—and on that basis criticized the practice of classifying children as "gifted" or "not gifted" on the basis of a single IQ cutoff. He has argued for a broader conception of giftedness—one that counts capacities such as creativity and imagination, rather than analytic ability alone. He has discussed this more expansive view of intelligence in public forums including NPR's Hidden Brain.

Kaufman has written extensively on twice-exceptional ("2e") students—children who have both exceptional abilities and a learning difficulty such as dyslexia, ADHD, or autism. He edited the volume Twice Exceptional: Supporting and Educating Bright and Creative Students with Learning Difficulties (Oxford University Press, 2018), which characterizes the 2e student as "neither exclusively disabled nor exclusively gifted" but as a dynamic interaction of both. He has argued that such students are frequently overlooked in schools because their strengths and difficulties can mask one another.

In a 2014 Education Week opinion piece written with several colleagues, Kaufman argued that gifted education itself is valuable but criticized how the "gifted" label is applied—citing schools that spend their entire gifted-education budget on the tests used to classify students, leaving little for programming, as well as the under-use of academic acceleration. He has advocated broadening access to advanced learning—through approaches such as universal screening and serving students' demonstrated needs rather than certifying a fixed category—and has more recently argued that giftedness is more widely distributed than conventional identification admits. He has argued that a single high-stakes test captures only a "slice in time" and that potential, being a moving target, is better assessed holistically over an extended period rather than at a single decisive moment.

=== Dual-process theory of human intelligence ===
Most theories of human intelligence and tests of intelligence emphasize controlled and deliberate reasoning as the hallmark of human intelligence. While agreeing that such thought processes are an important component of intelligence, Kaufman argues that spontaneous forms of thinking such as insight, imaginative play, daydreaming, implicit learning, and a reduced latent inhibition are also important contributors to a wide range of intelligent behaviors as well as creativity. Integrating modern dual-process theories of cognition with research on human intelligence, Kaufman proposed the dual-process theory of human intelligence. The theory emphasizes the importance of adaptation to task demands as the essence of intelligent functioning. At the same time, the theory takes into account an individual's personal goals and accommodates a wide range of intelligent behaviors in a wide range of fields, from the arts to the sciences. A key assumption of the theory is that abilities are not static entities but are constantly changing throughout the life span as the person continually engages with controlled and spontaneous modes of thought. In Ungifted: Intelligence Redefined, Kaufman expanded his dual-process theory to make the point that his theory is also fundamentally developmental, because it views intelligence as the dynamic interplay of engagement and ability over time in the pursuit of personal goals.

=== Creativity ===
Creativity is a central focus of Kaufman's research. In 2014 he became scientific director of the Imagination Institute, an independent non-profit housed within the University of Pennsylvania's Positive Psychology Center, which supported research on the measurement and development of imagination. His work distinguishes openness to experience from intellect as separable dimensions of personality, reporting that openness more strongly predicts creative achievement in the arts while intellect more strongly predicts achievement in the sciences. In Wired to Create: Unraveling the Mysteries of the Creative Mind (2015), written with journalist Carolyn Gregoire, he argued that creative people have "messy minds" that move between spontaneous and controlled modes of thought, drawing in particular on a brain system he calls the Imagination Network—his term for the default mode network, which he introduced in a 2013 article on the neuroscience of creativity.

=== Light triad ===
Influenced by the dark triad model of aversive personality traits, Kaufman and colleagues introduced the "light triad" in a 2019 study as a positive counterpart to the dark triad—a prosocial, benevolent orientation toward others. The light triad comprises three facets—Kantianism (treating people as ends in themselves), humanism (valuing the dignity and worth of each person), and faith in humanity (believing in the fundamental goodness of others)—measured by the 12-item Light Triad Scale. Kaufman and colleagues reported that the light and dark triads are only moderately negatively correlated, indicating that they represent distinct profiles of human nature rather than simple opposites. Since its introduction, the construct has been taken up widely in subsequent research, including independent structural validations and numerous cross-cultural adaptations of the scale.

=== Narcissism ===
Kaufman has also been involved in research examining grandiose and vulnerable subtypes of narcissism.

=== Tragic optimism ===
The concept of "tragic optimism" in the phrase coined by the existential-humanistic psychologist and Holocaust survivor Viktor Frankl, has been suggested by Kaufman as a healthy antidote to toxic positivity.

=== Self-actualization ===
In Transcend: The New Science of Self-Actualization (2020), Kaufman revisited Abraham Maslow's hierarchy of needs. Drawing in part on Maslow's unpublished later writings on transcendence, he proposed replacing the familiar pyramid with the metaphor of a sailboat: a hull representing the needs for safety, connection, and self-esteem, and a sail representing growth needs such as exploration, love, and purpose. Kaufman argued that the needs are not strictly hierarchical but interact dynamically over the course of a life.

=== Victim mindset ===
In Rise Above (2025), Kaufman examined what he termed a "victim mindset", distinguishing the reality of trauma and adversity from over-identification with the label of victim, and outlining research-based strategies for self-empowerment.

== The Psychology Podcast and Human Potential Lab ==
From 2014 to 2025, Kaufman hosted The Psychology Podcast, a long-running interview program featuring conversations with scientists, authors, and public figures on psychology, creativity, and well-being. The show ran for eleven years and 478 episodes; its final episode, released in 2025, featured science writer Annie Murphy Paul, who had also been the program's first guest in 2014. In October 2026, the podcast was relaunched as Human Potential Lab, focusing on neuroscience, consciousness, and technology.

== Center for Human Potential ==
Kaufman is the founder and director of the Center for Human Potential, through which he developed a self-actualization coaching certification program.

== Mentalism ==
Kaufman is also a mentalist and performs under the stage name "The Amazing Dr. Scott". He has described his use of mentalism as a vehicle for wonder and self-discovery, designing performances intended to challenge audiences' assumptions about the capacities of their own minds, an approach he links to his background in cognitive and humanistic psychology.

== Writing and recognition ==
Kaufman began the "Beautiful Minds" blog at Psychology Today in 2008 and moved it to Scientific American in 2013, where he wrote it for close to a decade. He has also contributed to The Atlantic, Big Think, and other outlets. In 2015, Business Insider named him one of "50 groundbreaking scientists who are changing the way we see the world". According to a 2023 Barnard College report drawing on an Elsevier/Stanford University citation analysis, Kaufman was among the top 2% of most-cited scientists worldwide.

== Awards ==
- 2006: American Psychological Association Dissertation Research Award
- 2008: Frank X. Barron Award, Society for the Psychology of Aesthetics, Creativity, and the Arts (APA Division 10)
- 2011–2012: Mensa Foundation Award for Excellence in Research, for "General Intelligence Predicts Reasoning Ability Even for Evolutionarily Familiar Content"
- 2012: Daniel E. Berlyne Award, Society for the Psychology of Aesthetics, Creativity, and the Arts (APA Division 10)

== Bibliography ==
=== Books ===
- Leading for Tomorrow: Unlocking Human Potential in an Era of Continuous Change and Endless Possibility (edited, with Chris Shipley) (2026) Hoboken, NJ: Wiley. (ISBN 978-1-394-36627-9)
- Rise Above: Overcome a Victim Mindset, Empower Yourself, and Realize Your Full Potential (2025) New York, NY: TarcherPerigee. (ISBN 0593715160)
- Choose Growth: A Workbook for Transcending Trauma, Fear, and Self-Doubt (2022) New York, NY: TarcherPerigee. (ISBN 0-593-53863-3)
- Transcend: The New Science of Self-Actualization (2020) New York, NY: TarcherPerigee. (ISBN 0-143-13120-6)
- Twice Exceptional: Supporting and Educating Bright and Creative Students with Learning Difficulties (2018) New York, NY: Oxford University Press. (ISBN 0-190-64547-4)
- Wired to Create: Unraveling the Mysteries of the Creative Mind (with Carolyn Gregoire) (2015) New York, NY: TarcherPerigee. (ISBN 0-399-17410-9)
- The Philosophy of Creativity (with Elliot Samuel Paul) (2014). New York, NY: Oxford University Press. (ISBN 0-199-83696-5)
- The Complexity of Greatness: Beyond Talent or Practice (2013) New York, NY: Oxford University Press. (ISBN 0-199-79400-6)
- Ungifted: Intelligence Redefined (2013). New York, NY: Basic Books. (ISBN 0-465-02554-4)
- Mating Intelligence Unleashed: The Role of the Mind in Sex, Dating, and Love (with Glenn Geher) (2013). New York, NY: Oxford University Press. (ISBN 0-195-39685-5)
- The Cambridge Handbook of Intelligence (with Robert J. Sternberg) (2011). New York, NY: Cambridge University Press. (ISBN 0-521-73911-X)
- The Psychology of Creative Writing (with James C. Kaufman) (2009). Cambridge, UK: Cambridge University Press. (ISBN 0-521-70782-X)
