= Nora Maccoby =

- Occupations: Artist; Screenwriter; Environmentalist
- Spouse: Todd Hathaway
- Parent(s): Sandylee Weille Maccoby; Michael Maccoby

Nora Maccoby is an American artist, filmmaker, and environmental activist.

== Biography ==
Maccoby was the daughter of Sandylee (née Weille) and Michael Maccoby. In 2004, Maccoby created the bipartisan energy literacy initiative, Nature's Partners.

Nora wrote the screenplay for the movie Bongwater that was released in 1998 and Buffalo Soldiers that was released in 2001.
