= Studies in Machiavellianism =

Nonfiction psychology book by Richard Christie and Florence Geis

Studies in Machiavellianism is a book published in 1970 by psychologists Richard Christie and Florence L. Geis. It is a collection of 38 studies into the interpersonal personality variable that they dubbed Machiavellianism. It is the first book on the subject, the first use of the word "Machiavellianism" as the name of a personality variable, and would launch an entire field of study.

== Overview ==
In the aftermath of World War II, psychologist Richard Christie set out to study the thought processes and actions of those who manipulated others, such as political ideologues and religious extremists. He found that there was many studies on those who followed the organizations and movements, but the only literature on those who actually led them were psychiatric in nature. Starting from the basics, Christie hypothesized that a "manipulator" or "operator" would possess the following characteristics:

- A relative lack of affect in interpersonal relationships
- A lack of concern for conventional morality
- A lack of gross psychopathology (i.e. a lack of mental illness)
- Low ideological commitment

From these characteristics, Christie would begin to build psychometrics to evaluate these traits within an individual. In creating his psychometric, he first began by seeking out historical figures such as Kautilya and Shang Yang before eventually landing upon Machiavelli. He would use these ideas to create test items loosely based on their prose. He would eventually base his psychometric questions on the style of Machiavelli, and label the new personality trait Machiavellianism as a nod to Machiavelli. Christie states that he was advised to not use "Machiavellianism" as a name choice due to its already existing political meaning. The research led to the creation of the MACH-IV, which would become the most widely used Machiavellianism test by researchers.

=== Experiments ===
The book features a series of experiments performed by Christie and his colleagues, with many of them being games. Examples include the "Con Game", the "10 Dollar Game" and so forth. The experiments revolved around the use of manipulative tactics in order to win. Those who score highly on the scale of Machiavellianism deceived more and had a cold, calculated, and detached disposition when doing said acts. The researchers would eventually call this the cool syndrome.

The authors also discovered that an individual's "Mach score" was also not linked to political views, racial attitudes, intelligence, or educational level, but rather stemmed from an individual's perspectives on behavior and morality.

=== Results from their research ===
The primary goal of their research was to evaluate whether or not agreement (or disagreement) with the test items showed differences in behavior and mentality. Not only did those higher on the scale manipulate more, but they did so more successfully than their low Mach counterparts. Highs were also more emotionally detached and callous than Lows. Christie stated that this is the primary difference between those who score low and those who score high. High Machs were more than likely to bluff more and lie about their actions in the experimental games.

== See also ==
- Machiavellianism in the workplace
- Dark triad
