= Light triad =

Personality model of three prosocial traits

The three facets of the light triad: Kantianism, Humanism, and Faith in Humanity.

The light triad is a model of personality comprising three prosocial traits: Kantianism, Humanism, and Faith in Humanity. The construct was introduced in 2019 by the psychologist Scott Barry Kaufman and his colleagues David Bryce Yaden, Elizabeth Hyde, and Eli Tsukayama, in the first peer-reviewed study to define the construct and provide a validated measure of it. It was conceived as a positive counterpart to the dark triad of personality (narcissism, Machiavellianism, and subclinical psychopathy).

Kaufman and colleagues described people who score high on the light triad as "everyday saints," and reported that the light triad and the dark triad are only moderately negatively correlated, indicating that the two are related but distinct profiles of human nature rather than simple opposites.

== Components ==
The light triad consists of three facets, each defined by Kaufman and colleagues in the 2019 study:

- Kantianism – treating people as ends in themselves rather than as means to an end (a reference to the moral philosophy of Immanuel Kant); for example, valuing others for who they are rather than for what they can provide.
- Humanism – valuing the dignity and worth of each individual.
- Faith in Humanity – believing in the fundamental goodness of human beings.

These three facets are conceptually positioned as the opposite of the antagonistic, manipulative, and callous orientation that characterizes the dark triad. In constructing the items, the authors deliberately wrote statements that represented an opposing interpersonal orientation rather than simply reverse-coding existing dark triad items.

== Measurement ==
The light triad is measured with the Light Triad Scale (LTS), a 12-item self-report questionnaire (four items per facet). The scale was developed and validated across four demographically diverse samples (total N = 1,518) drawn from the United States, the United Kingdom, and Ireland. In these studies the LTS showed strong reliability and validity, and predicted life satisfaction as well as a range of growth-oriented and self-transcendent outcomes over and above existing personality measures such as Big Five Agreeableness and the HEXACO Honesty–Humility dimension.

== Relationship to the dark triad ==
A central finding of the originating study was that the light triad is not merely the inverse of the dark triad. The two clusters were only moderately negatively correlated (reported at approximately r = −0.48), and the light triad predicted positive outcomes that could not be fully accounted for by low dark triad scores. Subsequent research using person-centered methods has identified distinct "light," "dark," and intermediate personality subtypes. A large multi-study analysis by Craig Neumann, Kaufman, and colleagues recovered these subtypes across very large samples, supporting the view that benevolent and malevolent dispositional styles are partly independent dimensions of personality.

Prior research has indicated that these three characteristics are relatively independent, that the Light Triad cannot be fully reduced to either the Dark Triad or fundamental personality dimensions, and that this construct predicts various outcomes related to personal growth and self-transcendence. The two studies presented here seek to cross-validate the structural makeup of this new construct, assess its irreducibility to broader models of aversive traits (the Dark Tetrad) and personality (HEXACO plus psychoticism), and explore its additional predictive value beyond dark traits for social worldviews, militant extremist mindset, and conspiratorial thinking. Lukic and others demonstrated that the Light Triad is no more reducible to broad personality domains than the dark traits are, although the light traits, unlike the dark ones, turned out to be weak predictors of adverse socio-psychological outcomes.

Scott Barry Kaufman and his colleagues noted that, overall, scores on the Light Triad, along with each of its three individual components, showed negative correlations with all dimensions of the Dark Triad. The strongest negative associations were observed between the Light Triad (and its facets) and Machiavellianism. In their regression analysis examining the unique variance contributed by each Dark Triad trait, both Machiavellianism and Psychopathy emerged as significant independent negative predictors of Light Triad scores, whereas Narcissism was a weak but significant positive independent predictor, with these results indicating that the three facets of the Light Triad are not merely the direct opposites of the three Dark Triad facets.

This research program has continued. A 2025 study led by Neumann and Kaufman reported that citizens of more democratic countries tended to have more benevolent traits, fewer malevolent traits, and greater well-being, and a 2026 study extended the person-centered approach to contrasting "benevolent" versus "malevolent" interpersonal dispositional styles.

== Structural and construct validity ==
The structure and validity of the light triad have been examined in independent studies. Lukić and Živanović (2021) cross-validated the three-factor structure and found that the light triad is no more reducible to broad models of personality (HEXACO plus psychoticism) or to the dark tetrad than the dark traits themselves are. They also found that, unlike the dark traits, the light traits were only weak predictors of adverse socio-psychological outcomes such as militant extremist mindset and conspiratorial thinking—an asymmetry between the two constructs.

== Research applications ==
=== Well-being and flourishing ===
Across studies, the light triad has been positively associated with psychological well-being, life satisfaction, and flourishing. A Spanish adaptation found positive links between the light triad and psychological well-being, and a study of Honduran adults found that all three facets positively predicted flourishing.

=== Close relationships ===
Light triad traits have been studied as predictors of relationship attitudes and behavior. Research has linked the light triad to using the dating application Tinder to seek love rather than casual sex, and to lower likelihood of infidelity.

=== Politics and worldviews ===
The light triad has been studied in relation to political behavior and broader social worldviews. Contrasting the two constructs, Peterson and Palmer (2021) found that the light and dark triads related differently to political ambition and participation, with the antagonistic dark traits more strongly tied to the drive to seek office and influence.

The construct has also been examined in relation to ideologically charged and antisocial worldviews. In contrast to the dark triad, the light triad has been found to be only a weak predictor of adverse socio-political outcomes such as a militant extremist mindset and conspiratorial thinking. Light triad traits have likewise been linked to civic and public-health behavior, including greater adherence to public-health measures during the COVID-19 pandemic.

Researchers associated with the light triad literature have also applied the broader benevolent–malevolent framework to contemporary political ideology and leadership. Neumann and Ngo (2025) reported that, across two large U.S. community samples, malevolent dispositions—and the relative absence of benevolent dispositions and empathy—were significantly associated with conservative political ideology and with favorable views of Donald Trump. In earlier research on political leadership, Leanne ten Brinke—a co-author of the 2020 light and dark subtypes study with Kaufman and Neumann—and colleagues coded the nonverbal behavior of 151 U.S. senators and found that behavior signaling psychopathy did not yield greater legislative influence, whereas behavior reflecting virtues such as courage, humanity, and justice predicted greater influence.

At the societal level, a 2025 study led by Neumann and Kaufman reported that citizens of more democratic countries tended to have more benevolent personality traits and fewer malevolent ones, alongside greater well-being.

=== Online behavior ===
Studies of behavior on the internet and social media have used the light and dark triads together to predict prosocial versus antisocial online behavior.

=== Environmental attitudes ===
Several studies have linked the light triad to pro-environmental concern and behavior. Research has connected light triad traits to pro-environmental engagement alongside value orientations, and a validation study in the Philippines reported associations with environmental concern and green purchase intentions.

=== Workplace and leadership ===
Interest in the light triad within organizational behavior and leadership research has grown rapidly, partly as a positive counterpart to the well-established literature on "dark triad leadership." A 2024 review identified leadership as one of the distinct emerging directions of light triad research.

Empirical and conceptual work in this area has examined a leader's light triad in relation to followers' perceived organizational support, the role of light triad traits in the relationship between abusive supervision and malevolent creativity, and the light triad's relationship to counterproductive work behavior and organizational citizenship behavior. Some scholars have proposed an explicit "bright triad" model of leadership as an alternative to dark triad leadership.

=== Moral judgment and artificial intelligence ===
A 2026 study in Ethics & Behavior applied the light triad to moral dilemma judgment, comparing human participants with large language models. In the human sample, light triad traits positively predicted sensitivity to moral norms, whereas dark triad traits predicted it negatively; the large language models only partially reproduced the human pattern, leading the authors to conclude that such models show only a preliminary capacity to simulate the relationship between personality and moral judgment.

=== Cross-cultural adaptations ===
The Light Triad Scale has been translated and psychometrically validated in many languages and cultures, reflecting broad international uptake of the construct. Validated adaptations include Polish, Brazilian Portuguese, Spanish, Filipino, Arabic, European Portuguese, and Greek versions, among others.

== Other proposed measures ==
The light triad as developed by Kaufman and colleagues is the most widely used and cited version of the construct, but it is not the only proposal to use the term. In a separate 2018 master's thesis, Laura K. D. Johnson independently proposed a different "light triad scale" (the Light-3) intended as a preliminary measure of a prosocial orientation. In Johnson's model the three components are empathy, compassion, and altruism, modeled as lower-order factors of a higher-order prosocial orientation. This measure is conceptually and operationally distinct from the Kaufman et al. Light Triad Scale—whose facets are Kantianism, Humanism, and Faith in Humanity—and has received considerably less research attention.

== Limitations ==
Reviews and validation studies have noted several limitations of the light triad. Across cultural adaptations, the Humanism subscale has tended to show lower internal reliability than the other two facets. The construct's predictive value is also asymmetric with that of the dark triad: light traits are comparatively weak predictors of adverse socio-psychological outcomes. As of the mid-2020s, no meta-analysis of the light triad had been published, and critical scrutiny of the measure has come primarily from within the validation literature rather than from dedicated critique studies. Like most personality measures, the Light Triad Scale relies on self-report, which is subject to limitations such as social desirability bias.

== See also ==
- Dark triad
- Big Five personality traits
- HEXACO model of personality structure
- Positive psychology
