= Consideration and initiating structure =

Two types of leadership behavior

Consideration and initiating structure are two dimensions of leader behavior identified in 1945 as a result of the Ohio State Leadership Studies. Reviews of research on these dimensions are described in Stogdill's Handbook of leadership: A survey of theory and research and Littrell's Explicit leader behaviour.

According to the findings of these studies, leaders exhibit two types of behaviors to facilitate goal accomplishment:

- People-oriented (consideration)
- Task oriented (initiating structure)

The model is similar to the Michigan Studies of Leadership.

In his Handbook, Stogdill expanded the model to twelve dimensions.

== Ohio State Leadership Studies ==
Prior to 1945 most studies of leadership sought to identify the individual traits of effective leaders.

Trait theories of leadership were the first to attempt a systematic approach of studying leadership. However, these studies yielded disappointing results when no set of traits were found that explained effective leadership.

In 1945, a group of researchers at the Ohio State University sought to identify the observable behaviors of leaders instead of identifying personality traits.

=== Leaders Behavior Description Questionnaire (LBDQ) ===
To accomplish this they generated a list of 1790 statements. This was narrowed down to 150 statements designed to measure nine different dimensions of leader behavior. These statements were used to develop the Leaders Behavior Description Questionnaire (LBDQ).

After further research, the LBDQ-XII, was developed, assessing 12 factors/dimensions of leader behavior.

== Consideration and initiating structure ==
=== Consideration ===
Consideration is the extent to which a leader exhibits concern for the welfare of the members of the group.

This factor is oriented towards interpersonal relationships, mutual trust and friendship.

This leadership style is people-oriented.

Some of the statements used to measure this factor in the LBDQ are:

- Being friendly
- Treating all group members as his/her equal
- Looking out for the personal welfare of group members
- Making him/herself accessible to group members

=== Initiating structure ===
Initiating structure is the extent to which a leader defines leader and group member roles, initiates actions, organizes group activities and defines how tasks are to be accomplished by the group.

This leadership style is task-oriented.

Some of the statements used to measure this factor in the LBDQ are:

- Letting group members know what is expected of them (directive leadership)
- Maintaining definite standards of performance
- Scheduling the work to be done
- Checking that group members follow standard rules and regulations
