= Narcissistic leadership =

Leadership style

Narcissistic leadership is the concept of being under a leader that has characteristics of narcissism. Narcissism is most often described as unhealthy and destructive. It has been described as "driven by unyielding arrogance, self-absorption, and a personal egotistic need for power and control and admiration". Narcissists initially emerge as leaders, especially in groups of strangers, but their leadership appeal declines over time as group members become more familiar with them, leading to a fade in their perception due to leadership behaviors.

== Narcissism and groups ==
A study published in the journal Personality and Social Psychology Bulletin suggests that when a group is without a leader, a narcissist is likely to take charge. Researchers have found that people who score high in narcissism tend to take control of leaderless groups. Freud considered "the narcissistic type... especially suited to act as a support for others, to take on the role of leaders and to... impress others as being 'personalities'.": one reason may be that "another person's narcissism has a great attraction for those who have renounced part of their own... as if we envied them for maintaining a blissful state of mind—an unassailable libidinal position which we ourselves have since abandoned."

According to the book Narcissism: Behind the Mask, there are four basic types of leader with narcissists most commonly in type 3 although they may be in type 1:

1. authoritarian with task oriented decision making
2. democratic with task oriented decision making
3. authoritarian with emotional decision making
4. democratic with emotional decision making

Michael Maccoby stated that "psychoanalysts don't usually get close enough to narcissistic leaders, especially in the workplace, to write about them."

== Corporate narcissism ==
According to Alan Downs, corporate narcissism occurs when a narcissist becomes the chief executive officer (CEO) or other leadership roles within the senior management team and gathers an adequate mix of codependents around them to support the narcissistic behavior. Narcissists profess company loyalty but are only really committed to their own agendas, thus organizational decisions are founded on the narcissist's own interests rather than the interests of the organization as a whole, the various stakeholders, or the society in which the organization operates. As a result, "a certain kind of charismatic leader can run a financially successful company on thoroughly unhealthy principles for a time.

Neville Symington has suggested that "one of the ways of differentiating a good-enough organisation from one that is pathological is through its ability to exclude narcissistic characters from key posts."

== Impact of healthy v. destructive narcissistic managers ==
Lubit compared healthily narcissistic managers versus destructively narcissistic managers for their long-term impact on organizations.

| Characteristic | Healthy narcissism | Destructive narcissism |
|---|---|---|
| Self-confidence | High outward self-confidence in line with reality | Grandiose |
| Desire for power, wealth and admiration | May enjoy power | Pursues power and control at all costs, lacks normal inhibitions in its pursuit |
| Relationships | Real concern for others and their ideas; does not exploit or devalue others | Concerns limited to expressing socially appropriate response when convenient; devalues and exploits others without remorse |
| Ability to follow a consistent path | Has values; follows through on plans | Lacks moral and legal values; easily bored; often changes course |
| Foundation | Healthy childhood with support for self-esteem and appropriate limits on behaviour towards others | Traumatic childhood undercutting true sense of self-esteem/learning that one doesn't need to be considerate of others |

== See also ==
- Charismatic leadership
- Control freak
- Cult of personality
- Healthy narcissism
- Leadership accountability
- Narcissism in the workplace
- Narcissistic rage and narcissistic injury
- Queen bee syndrome
- Toxic leader
- Workplace bullying
