= Resource dependence theory =

Economic theory

Resource dependence theory is the study of how the external resources of an organization affect the behavior of the organization. The procurement of external resources is an important tenet of both the strategic and tactical management of any company. Nevertheless, a theory of the consequences of this importance was not formalized until the 1970s, with the publication of The External Control of Organizations: A Resource Dependence Perspective (Pfeffer and Salancik 1978). Resource dependence theory has implications regarding the optimal divisional structure of organizations, recruitment of board members and employees, production strategies, contract structure, external organizational links, and many other aspects of organizational strategy.

== Argument for ==
The basic argument of resource dependence theory can be summarized as follows:

- Organizations depend on resources.
- These resources ultimately originate from an organization's environment.
- The environment, to a considerable extent, contains other organizations.
- The resources one organization needs are thus often in the hand of other organizations.
- Resources are a basis of power.
- Legally independent organizations can therefore depend on each other.
- Power and resource dependence are directly linked:

Organization A's power over organization B is equal to organization B's dependence on organization A's resources.

- Power is thus relational, situational and potentially mutual.

Organizations depend on multidimensional resources: labor, capital, raw material, etc. Organizations may not be able to come out with countervailing initiatives for all these multiple resources. Hence organization should move through the principle of criticality and principle of scarcity. Critical resources are those the organization must have to function. For example, a burger outlet can't function without bread. An organization may adopt various countervailing strategies—it may associate with more suppliers, or integrate vertically or horizontally.

== View on organisations ==
=== Organisational boundaries ===
Resource dependence theory is inspired by open system theory and see organisations as a coalition of interests facing an environment of potentially conflicting demands and who need resources from this environment in order to survive. Regarding the definition of the boundaries of an organisation (who is "in" and who is "out" of it), resource dependence theory suggest that what is coordinated by an organisation are specific behaviours rather than individuals. Thus, the inclusion of an individual in an organisation is defined by the proportion of the persons behaviours included in the organisation compared to the total amount of behaviours.

=== Organisational effectiveness ===
Resource dependence theory postulate that there is no absolute criteria to define an organisation's success or performance, because these criteria depends on who evaluates the organisation. The theory use the concept of organisational effectiveness to reflect this idea. Organisational effectiveness is "the assessment of the organization's output and activities by each of the various groups or participants". Effectiveness should not be confused with the concept of efficiency. Efficiency consist in producing the same output with less inputs, while effectiveness is about the definition of the desirable outputs. An effective organisation is then an organisation "which satisfies the demands of those in its environment from whom it requires support for its continued existence".

== Sources of resource dependency ==
An organisation becomes dependent when the resource it is seeking is both important and concentrated in the hands of few organisations. However, since organisations can be mutually dependent, an organisation will have power over another only if there is an asymmetry in the exchange relationship and that one organisation is more dependent than the other.

=== Resource exchange importance ===
To determine whether a resource exchange is important for an organisation, two criteria are used. First, the "Magnitude of exchange" is "measurable by assessing the "proportion of total inputs or the proportion of total outputs accounted for by the exchange". For example, if a company sells only one product, it is dependent on the sale of this product. Then "Criticality" is "the ability of the organization to continue functioning in the absence of the resource or in the absence of the market for the output". For example, electricity is a small portion of a company expenditure but most office cannot function without it.

=== Discretion over resource ===
Various means can be used to get control over a resource. These means includes possessing the resource (e.g. directly possessing knowledge), having ownership rights over the resource enforced by legal and social systems, being part of the resource allocation process (e.g. a secretary can determine who access the boss) or being a user of the resource (e.g. workers can slow down production process to pressure employers). Finally, control can stem from the ability to "regulate the possession, allocation and use of resources and to enforce the regulation".

=== Concentration of resource control ===
An organisation will be more dependent on another organisation if this organisation concentrate the control over an important resource. "Concentration of resource control" is then "the extent to which the focal organisation can substitute sources for the same resource". Concentration can for example stem from market concentration, cartels, coordinated action, or regulation actors.

== Main hypothesis ==
=== Success of external control attempts ===
Resource dependency theory aims to explain why an organisation comply to the demands of external social actors. Pfeffer & Salancik propose that an organisation will comply to external control attempts if:

1. "The focal organization is aware of the demands.
2. The focal organization obtains some resources from the social actor making the demands.
3. The resource is a critical or important part of the focal organization's operation.
4. The social actor controls the allocation, access, or use of the resource; alternative sources for the resource are not available to the focal organization.
5. The focal organization does not control the allocation, access, or use of other resources critical to the social actor's operation and survival.
6. The actions or outputs of the focal organization are visible and can be assessed by the social actor to judge whether the actions comply with its demands.
7. The focal organization's satisfaction of the social actor's requests are not in conflict with the satisfaction of demands from other components of the environment with which it is interdependent.
8. The focal organization does not control the determination, formulation, or expression of the social actor's demands.
9. The focal organization is capable of developing actions or outcomes that will satisfy the external demands.
10. The organization desires to survive".

== Applications ==
Recently, resource dependence theory has been under scrutiny in several review and meta-analytic studies. Which all indicate and discuss the importance of this theory in explaining the actions of organizations, by forming interlocks, alliances, joint ventures, and mergers and acquisitions, in striving to overcome dependencies and improve an organizational autonomy and legitimacy.

=== Inter-organisational arrangements ===
Predictions of resource-depence theory has been confirmed by a meta-analysis in the domain of inter-organisational arrangements including interlocks, alliances, joint-ventures, in-sourcing arrangements and mergers and acquisitions. Resource dependence increase the likelihood of the formation of interorganisational arrangements, and the formation of these arrangements increases organisational autonomy and legicimacy.

==== Mergers ====
Mergers are a way for an organisation to control asymmetrical interdependence by "absorbing it" and to become more powerful. Mergers can be used to manage diverse interdependence through vertical integration to avoid competition, horizontal integration to avoid dependence on supplier/clients or diversification to avoid dependence on a single activity. The prediction of resource dependence theory is largely supported by empirical research, although other factors or theories can also explain why organisations merge.

=== Performance ===
While resource dependence theory is one of many theories of organizational studies that characterize organizational behavior, it is not a theory that explains an organization's performance per se.

=== Non profit organisation ===
Resource dependence theory effects on nonprofit sector have been studied and debated in recent times. Scholars have argued that Resource dependence theory is one of the main reasons nonprofit organizations have become more commercialized in recent times. With less government grants and resources being used for social services, contract competition between private and nonprofit sector has increased and led to nonprofit organizations using marketization techniques used mainly in the private sector to compete for resources to maintain their organizations livelihood. Scholars have argued that the marketization of the nonprofit sector will lead to a decrease of quality in services provided by nonprofit organizations.

=== Internal organisational structure ===
Resource dependence concerns more than the external organizations that provide, distribute, finance, and compete with a firm. Although executive decisions have more individual weight than non-executive decisions, in aggregate the latter have greater organizational impact. Managers throughout the organization understand their success is tied to customer demand. Managers' careers thrive when customer demand expands. Thus customers are the ultimate resource on which companies depend. Although this seems obvious in terms of revenue, it is actually organizational incentives that make management see customers as a resource.

== Links with other theories ==
Resource dependence theory predictions are similar to those of transaction cost economics, but it also shares some aspects with institutional theory.

== See also ==
- Consumer sovereignty
- Economic anthropology
- Outline of organizational theory
