= Linking pin model =

The linking pin model is an idea developed by Rensis Likert. It presents an organisation as a number of overlapping work units in which a member of a unit is the leader of another unit. In this scheme, the supervisor/manager has the dual task of maintaining unity and creating a sense of belonging within their supervised group and representing that group in meetings with superior and parallel management staff. These individuals are the linking pins within the organisation and so they become the focus of leadership development activities.

== Sources ==
- Likert, Rensis (1967). The Human Organization: Its Management and Value. New York: McGraw-Hill.
