= Narcissism in the workplace =

Problem producing an impact on an organization

Narcissism in the workplace involves the impact of narcissistic employees and managers in workplace settings.

== Job interviews ==
Narcissists often excel in job interviews, receiving more favorable evaluations compared to non-narcissistic candidates. Typically, this is because they can make favorable first impressions, due to their high confidence, self-promotion, and charm like communication. They are more likely to exaggerate their successes and project a sense of being in control, all qualities that typically exude the status of a self-motivated leader, though that may not translate to better job performance once hired.

== Impact on workplace satisfaction ==
=== Impact on stress, absenteeism and staff turnover ===
There tends to be a higher level of stress with people who work with or interact with a narcissist. While there are a variety of reasons for this to be the case, an important one is the relationship between narcissism and aggression. Aggression may influence the relationship between narcissism and counterproductive workplace behaviors. According to Penney and Spector, narcissism is positively related to counterproductive workplace behaviors, such as interpersonal aggression, sabotaging the work of others, finding excuses to waste other peoples' time and resources, and spreading rumors. These aggressive acts can increase the stress of other employees, which in turn increases absenteeism and staff turnover. Moreover, no correlation was found between employees under the directions of a narcissist leader and absenteeism. However, employees under the direction of a non-narcissist leader show a decline in absenteeism over time.

=== Workplace bullying ===
In 2007, researchers Catherine Mattice and Brian Spitzberg at San Diego State University, USA, found that narcissism revealed a positive relationship with bullying. Narcissists were found to prefer indirect bullying tactics (such as withholding information that affects others' performance, ignoring others, spreading gossip, constantly reminding others of mistakes, ordering others to do work below their competence level, and excessively monitoring others' work) rather than direct tactics (such as making threats, shouting, persistently criticizing, or making false allegations). Narcissists are likely to be more emotionally volatile and aggressive than other employees, which could become a risk for all employees.

The research also revealed that narcissists are highly motivated to bully, and that to some extent, they are left with feelings of satisfaction after a bullying incident occurs. Despite the fact that many narcissists will avoid work, they can be eager to steal the work of others. In line with other dark triad traits, many narcissists will manipulate others and their environment so that they can claim responsibility for company accomplishments that they had little or nothing to do with. A study was done in 2017, that looked at dark traits within those who hold leadership positions and that effect on employee depression. The research done supported the idea that employees mental health and stability was negatively affected by bullying (some narcissistic behavior) in the workplace.

==== Workplace cyber-bullying ====
Cyber-bullying involves the use of technology such as mobile phones and/or computers. This might involve a party making abusive phone calls, harassment through texts and email, and more. With the rise of work-from-home positions, a narcissist can work through the technology, affecting fellow employees' mental health, creating a hostile work environment, and increasing employees' turnover intention. Employees' mental health is often affected when cyber-bullying is involved, which could lead to anxiety, stress, and mental exhaustion.

== Organizational design preferences ==
Narcissists take special interest in acquiring leadership positions and may be better at procuring them. Besides, narcissists are less interested in hierarchies where there is little opportunity for upward mobility. The prototypical narcissist is more concerned with getting praised and how they are perceived than doing what benefits all of the "stakeholders". Some narcissistic attributes may confer benefits, but the negative and positive outcomes of narcissistic leadership are not yet fully understood. In terms of the internal functioning of organizations, narcissists can be especially damaging, or ill-fit, to jobs that require judicious self assessment, heavily rely on teams, and/or use 360 degree feedback.

=== Corporate narcissism ===
According to Alan Downs, corporate narcissism occurs when a narcissist becomes the chief executive officer (CEO) (or another leadership role) within the senior management team and gathers an adequate mix of codependents around him or her to support the narcissistic behavior. Narcissists profess company loyalty but are only really committed to their own agendas; thus, organizational decisions are founded on the narcissist's own interests rather than the interests of the organization as a whole, the various stakeholders, or the society in which the organization operates. As a result, a certain kind of charismatic leader can run a financially successful company on thoroughly unhealthy principles (at least for a time). Narcissists believe that they are more intelligent than the average person, and this confidence could be attributed to how they end up in leadership positions, but once they are in this position, they are known to try to make others look bad to make sure they stay on top. They desire leadership roles mainly due to their want to achieve a high social status.

Neville Symington has suggested that one of the ways of differentiating a good-enough organization from one that is pathological is through its ability to exclude narcissistic characters from key posts.

== Narcissistic supply ==
The narcissistic manager will have two main sources of narcissistic supply: inanimate (status symbols like cars, gadgets or office views); and animate (flattery and attention from colleagues and subordinates). Teammates may find everyday offers of support swiftly turn them into enabling sources of permanent supply, unless they are very careful to maintain proper boundaries. The narcissistic manager's need to protect such supply networks will prevent objective decision-making. Such a manager will evaluate long-term strategies according to their potential for gaining personal attention instead of to benefit the organization.

== Productive narcissists ==
Crompton has distinguished what he calls productive narcissists from unproductive narcissists. Michael Maccoby acknowledged that productive narcissists still tend to be over-sensitive to criticism, over-competitive, isolated, and grandiose, but they have the drive to be a leader and help a company make big strides towards success. Studies show that narcissists tend to be more proactive in their work in an attempt to achieve a higher, more prestigious status.

Others have questioned the concept, having in mind the collapse of Wall Street and the financial system in 2009. Crompton concluded that at best there can be a fine line between narcissists who perform badly in the workplace because of their traits, and those who achieve outsized success because of them.

== Gender and narcissism in the workplace ==
Gender differences in narcissism can have notable implications in workplace dynamics, especially in how individuals present themselves, assert authority, and pursue leadership roles. Research indicates that men generally score higher than women on measures of narcissism, particularly in traits such as entitlement, authority, and exhibitionism. These characteristics can influence how individuals are perceived in professional settings, potentially giving men an advantage in hierarchical or competitive environments where assertiveness and self-promotion are often rewarded. This discrepancy in narcissistic traits may also help explain differences in how men and women navigate leadership roles or are evaluated in positions of power.

Narcissism appears to relate to entrepreneurial behavior, but this relationship varies by gender. One study found that narcissistic traits are more strongly linked to self-employment in men than in women, suggesting that men may be more likely to translate narcissistic confidence into entrepreneurial ventures. This may be due to both societal expectations and structural barriers that influence how narcissism is expressed or rewarded across genders. As a result, the intersection of gender and narcissism not only shapes individual career paths but also affects broader patterns of leadership, self-employment, and representation in the workplace.

Moreover, narcissism is closely tied to workplace incivility, and gendered perceptions influence this relationship. While the research primarily focuses on overt narcissism, recent studies have highlighted the impact of covert narcissism. Individuals with high covert narcissism are more likely to experience or perceive incivility, or the quality or state of being uncivil, in the workplace, as they tend to interpret ambiguous behaviors more negatively.

Perceived norms for respect play a critical role in shaping experiences of workplace incivility. Research suggests that individuals with high covert narcissism are less likely to perceive workplace norms as respectful, which can increase their sensitivity to perceived slights or rude behaviors. This creates a feedback loop in which the absence of mutual respect further amplifies feelings of incivility. This dynamic is particularly significant for women, who may already be subject to biased perceptions of their authority and competence.

== See also ==
- Machiavellianism in the workplace
- Narcissistic leadership
- Occupational health psychology
- Psychopathy in the workplace
