= Likert's management systems =

Classification of management styles

Likert's management systems are descriptions of management styles developed by Rensis Likert in the 1960s. He outlined four systems of management to describe the relationship, involvement, and roles of managers and subordinates in industrial settings. He based the systems on studies of highly productive supervisors and their team members of an American Insurance Company. Later, he and Jane G. Likert revised the systems to apply to educational settings. They initially intended to spell out the roles of principals, students, and teachers; eventually others such as superintendents, administrators, and parents were included. The management systems, established by Likert, include "Exploitative Authoritative (System I), Benevolent Authoritative (System II), Consultative (System III), and Participative (System IV)."

== Management systems ==
=== Exploitative authoritative (I) ===
In the exploitative authoritative system, leaders have a low concern for people and use methods such as threats and other fear-based methods to get their workers to conform. As a result of these methods, employees immediately have excellent performance upon entering the organization. Oftentimes negative feelings are to follow once they settle in. Communication is entirely downwards and psychological concerns of people are ignored. Lateral interaction or teamwork between subordinates lacks in this system based on managerial interactions. Employees are expected to exceed their specified work hours creating negative work environments in organizations. Upper management forces a large work load on employees, however wages, monetary benefits and work satisfaction do not accompany the work. Workers are often found highly demotivated due to exploitation by management. Management does not trust employees, therefore they are not part of decision-making processes.

=== Benevolent authoritative (II) ===
The benevolent authoritative system uses less control over employees than the exploitative authoritative system, however, this system motivates employees through potential punishment and rewards. Lower-level employees are more involved in the decision-making processes, but are still limited by upper management. Employees in this system are involved in policy-making and group problem solving. Major policy decisions are left to those at the top, who have awareness of the problems that occur at both upper and lower levels throughout the organization. This results in mostly downward communication from supervisors to employees. Little upward communication occurs, causing subordinates to be somewhat suspicious of communication coming from the top. The upper management tends to control the way employees can communicate to others and how they make decisions. This contrast in feelings toward responsibility can result in conflict, which can create negative attitudes within the organization. Subordinates in this system can become hostile towards each other because of the competition that is created between them. Satisfaction among workers is low to moderately-low and productivity is measured at fair to good.

=== Consultative system (III) ===
The consultative system is very closely related to the human-relations theory. Subordinates gain motivation through rewards, occasional punishments, and little involvement in making decisions and setting goals. When compared to the first two systems, employees have more freedom to communicate and make company decisions. Lower-level employees have the freedom to make specific decisions that will affect their work. Upper-management still has control over policies and general decisions that affect an organization. Managers talk to their subordinates about problems and action plans before they set organizational goals. Communication in this system flows both downward and upward, though upward is more limited. This promotes a more positive effect on employee relationships and allows for more cooperation. As a result, upper-level managers make company decisions with consideration for input from subordinates. Lower-level employees are seen as consultants to previous decisions and are more willing to accept change because of their involvement in major decisions. Satisfaction in this system improves from benevolent authoritative as does productivity.

=== Participative system (IV) ===
The participative system promotes genuine participation in decision-making and goal setting in order to promote a workplace where all members equally share information. Likert argues that the participative system is the most effective form of management within the systems. This system also coincides with human-resources theory based on the level of lateral interaction between employees and managers. Managers recognize problems that occur when there is little cohesiveness between members of an organization. Free-flowing lateral communication and the use of creativity and skills allows workers to become more involved within the organization. Organizational goals are accepted universally in this system because all individuals are actively involved in their creation. All employees have a high level of responsibility and accountability for these goals. Managers motivate employees through a system that produces monetary awards, participation in goal setting, and trust from management. Management also encourages employees to get involved outside of their occupational role and create relationships with employees of all levels in the organization. Commonly managers are more open minded and creative in comparison to systems I-III. The participative system creates identification with the organization, satisfaction, and higher production among employees when compared to the previous three systems.

== See also ==
- Outline of management
