= Florence L. Geis =

American social psychologist

Florence Lindauer Geis (1933–October 7, 1993) was an American social psychologist and academic known for her research on gender bias and contributions to feminist scholarship. She was the first female faculty member in the University of Delaware's psychology department, where she served for 25 years.

Geis earned a Bachelor of Arts in English from the University of Arizona and later obtained a Ph.D. in social psychology from Columbia University. Her dissertation led to the influential book Studies in Machiavellianism, co-authored with Richard Christie, which established her as a prominent scholar.

She co-authored several influential works, including Seeing and Evaluating People with Mae Carter and The Organizational Woman: Power and Paradox with Beth Haslett and Carter. Her scholarship was widely used in institutions nationwide to inform discussions on gender and diversity.

She was recognized with the University of Delaware’s Excellence in Teaching Award in 1981 and the American Psychological Association (APA) Division 35’s Heritage Research Award a decade later.

Despite suffering from renal failure and undergoing a kidney transplant, she remained committed to her academic work until her final months. She died from lung cancer in 1993 at the age of 60. The University of Delaware honored her achievements by making her the first recipient of the E. A. Trabant Award for Women’s Equity in 1989. Her tombstone inscription reflects her lifelong dedication: "Feminist, Scholar, Teacher."
