= Richard Christie (psychologist) =

American psychologist

Richard Christie (1918–1992) was an American social and personality psychologist. He was influential in many studies on human psychology, most notably in the creation of the personality trait known as Machiavellianism.

== Life ==
Christie was born in Perdue, Saskatchewan. Christie obtained his bachelor's degree from the University of Tulsa in 1942, became a U.S. citizen, and served in the Air Force during World War II. He earned a master's from the University of Nebraska in 1947 and a doctorate from the University of California, Berkeley in 1949. He joined Columbia's faculty as a fellow in 1956, and became a full professor in 1960. He chaired the Department of Social Psychology from 1962 to 1965 and 1967 to 1968, retiring in 1988. He was influential in studies of the authoritarian personality, and in creating the machiavellianism scale in his career.

Christie was married to Delores Kreisman, an associate clinical professor of psychiatry, and had five children: a son named Lance, and three daughters, Rebecca, Gail, and Margaret Kellogg. He also had five grandchildren, and three great-grandchildren.

Christie died in his apartment in 1992 of a heart attack.

=== Studies in Machiavellianism ===
Studies in Machiavellianism is a book published in 1970 by Christie and his research partner Florence L. Geis. The book consists of a series of studies into a personality style which is characterized by manipulativeness and callousness. It is the first book on the psychology construct that would be named "Machiavellianism", and was the catalyst of creating an entire field of study around the personality trait.

In the 1960s, Christie and his colleagues were interested in studying those who were skilled in controlling and manipulating others. He theorized that a manipulator would have affective-interpersonal characteristics which would be beneficial to their goals, such as having a lack of empathy, disregard for morality, a lack of mental illness, and an indifference to ideology. While conceptualizing a scale for manipulative behavior, he was reminded of the works of Niccolò Machiavelli, which shocked and intrigued Christie when he was an undergraduate. Christie and his colleagues would then develop a psychometric test consisting of colloquialized statements similar to the general writing style of Machiavelli, naming their personality construct "Machiavellianism". High Machiavellianism scores correlated with a cold, unprincipled nature and a greater willingness to manipulate others.

He discovered that an individual's "Mach score" was also not linked to political views, racial attitudes, intelligence, or educational level, but rather stemmed from an individual's perspectives on behavior and morality.
