= Psychopathy in the workplace =

Prevalence of psychopathy in organizations

While psychopaths typically represent a very small percentage of workplace staff, the presence of psychopathy in the workplace, especially within senior management, can do enormous damage. Indeed, psychopaths are usually most present at higher levels of corporate structure, and their actions often cause a ripple effect throughout an organization, setting the tone for an entire corporate culture. Examples of detrimental effects include increased bullying, conflict, stress, staff turnover, absenteeism, and reduction in both productivity and social responsibility. Ethical standards of entire organisations can be badly damaged if a corporate psychopath is in charge. A 2017 UK study found that companies with leaders who show "psychopathic characteristics" destroy shareholder value, tending to have poor future returns on equity.

Academics refer to psychopathic individuals in organizational settings as workplace psychopaths. Criminal psychologist Robert D. Hare coined the term "snakes in suits" as a synonym for workplace psychopaths.

== General ==
Oliver James identifies psychopathy as one of the dark triadic personality traits in the workplace, the others being narcissism and Machiavellianism.

Workplace psychopaths are often charming to staff above their level in the workplace hierarchy but abusive to staff below their level. They maintain multiple personas throughout the office, presenting each colleague with a different version of themselves.

Hare considers newspaper tycoon Robert Maxwell to have been a strong candidate as a corporate psychopath.

== Incidence ==
Hare reports that about 1 percent of the general population meets the clinical criteria for psychopathy. Hare further claims that the prevalence of psychopaths is higher in the business world than in the general population. Figures of around 3–4 percent have been cited for more senior positions in business.

== The organizational psychopath ==
Psychopaths aim to reach the very highest levels of their organizations, allowing them to control the greatest number of people.

Organizational psychopaths generally appear to be intelligent, sincere, powerful, charming, witty, and entertaining communicators. They quickly assess what people want to hear and then create stories that fit those expectations. They will con people into doing their work for them, take credit for other people's work and even assign their work to junior staff members. They have low patience when dealing with others, display shallow emotions, are unpredictable, undependable, and fail to take responsibility if something goes wrong that is their fault.

According to a study from the University of Notre Dame published in the Journal of Business Ethics, psychopaths have a natural advantage in workplaces overrun by abusive supervision, and are more likely to thrive under abusive bosses, being more resistant to stress, including interpersonal abuse, and having less of a need for positive relationships than others.

== Careers with highest proportion of psychopaths ==
According to Kevin Dutton, the ten careers with the highest proportion of those who score high on psychopathic traits are:

1. CEO
2. Lawyer
3. Media (TV/radio)
4. Salesperson
5. Surgeon
6. Journalist
7. Police officer
8. Clergy
9. Chef
10. Civil servant

Workplace psychopaths may show a high number of the following behavior patterns. The individual behaviors are not exclusive to the workplace psychopath, though the higher the number of patterns exhibited, the more likely they conform to the psychopath profile:

- Public humiliation of others (high propensity of having temper tantrums or ridiculing work performance)
- Malicious spreading of lies (intentionally deceitful)
- Remorseless, devoid of guilt
- Frequently lie to push one's own point
- Produce exaggerated bodily expressions (yawning, sneezing, etc.) as a means of gaining attention
- Rapidly shift between emotions – used to manipulate people or cause high anxiety
- Intentionally isolate persons from organizational resources
- Quick to blame others for mistakes or for incomplete work even though they are guilty
- Encourage co-workers to torment, alienate, harass, and/or humiliate other peers
- Take credit for others' accomplishments
- Steal and/or sabotages other persons' work
- Refuse to take responsibility for misjudgements and/or errors
- Respond inappropriately to stimuli, such as with a high-pitched and forced laugh
- Threaten any perceived enemy with discipline and/or job loss in order to taint employee file
- Set unrealistic and unachievable job expectations to set employees up for failure
- Refuse or are reluctant to attend meetings with more than one person
- Refuse to provide adequate training and/or instructions to singled-out victim
- Invade personal privacy of others
- Have multiple sexual encounters with other employees
- Develop new ideas without real follow-through
- Very self-centered and extremely egotistical (often conversation revolves around them – great deal of self-importance)
- Often "borrow" money and/or other material objects without any intentions of giving it back
- Will do whatever it takes to close the deal (no regard for ethics or legality)

== Attainment of success ==
The authors of the book Snakes in Suits: When Psychopaths Go to Work describe a five-phase model of how a typical workplace psychopath tries to climb the corporate ladder:

1. Entry – psychopaths may use highly developed social skills and charm to obtain employment into an organization. At this stage it could be difficult to spot anything indicative of psychopathic behaviour, and as a new employee, the psychopath might be perceived by people to be helpful and even benevolent.
2. Assessment – psychopaths categorize people according to personal usefulness, and people could be recognized as either a pawn (who has some informal influence and will be easily manipulated) or a patron (who has formal position and can be used by the psychopath to protect against attacks).
3. Manipulation – psychopaths try to create a scenario of “psychopathic fiction” where positive information about themselves and negative disinformation or gossip about others, where people's role as a part of a network of pawns or patrons could be utilized and could be groomed into accepting the psychopath's agenda.
4. Confrontation – the psychopath can use techniques of character assassination to maintain their agenda, and people will be either discarded as a pawn or used as a patron.
5. Ascension – the role of the subject as a patron in the psychopath's quest for power will be discarded, and the psychopath will take for himself/herself a position of power and prestige from anyone who once supported them.

== Job seeking and hiring ==
Leading commentators on psychopathy have said that companies inadvertently attract employees who are psychopaths because of the wording of their job advertisements and their desire to engage people who are prepared to do whatever it takes to be successful in business. However, in one case at least, an advert explicitly asked for a sales executive with psychopathic tendencies. The advert title read "Psychopathic New Business Media Sales Executive Superstar! £50k – £110k".

Corporate psychopaths are recruited into organizations because they tend to make a positive impression during interviews. Typically they appear to be alert, friendly, and easy to get along with and talk to. These traits make them attractive to those in charge of hiring staff within organizations. Unlike narcissists, psychopaths are able to create long-lasting favorable first impressions, though people may still eventually see through their facades. Their superficial charm may be misinterpreted by interviewers as charisma.

Those who score high on psychopathic traits are more likely to lie in interviews. For instance, psychopaths may create fictitious work experiences or resumes and skeptical high performers can easily discern such fiction. They may also fabricate credentials such as diplomas, certifications, or awards and due diligence and skeptics and high performers easily discern such fabrications. Thus, in addition to seeming competent and likable in interviews, psychopaths are also more likely to outright make-up information during interviews than non-psychopaths and thus the necessity of including extremely skeptical high performing loyal employees throughout the entire interview and review of each interview.

=== Promotion of psychopathic individuals ===
Corporate psychopaths within organizations may be singled out for rapid promotion because of their polish, charm, and cool decisiveness and yet can also be singled out for rapid firing and removal. They are also helped by their manipulative and bullying skills. They create confusion around them (divide and rule, etc.) using instrumental bullying to promote their own agenda.

Psychopaths are able to maintain calm when others are reacting to normal stress and dangerous situations. Psychopaths are well versed in impression management and ingratiation, both of which can be used to impress people in positions of power and are also obvious indications of psychopathic traits easily discerned.

== Consequences of psychopathic behavior ==
Boddy identifies the following bad consequences of workplace psychopathy (with additional cites in some cases):

- Workplace bullying of employees
- Employees lose their jobs
- Legal liabilities
- Shareholders lose their investments
- Wasted employee time
- Suboptimal employee performance
- Increased workload
- Difficult working conditions
- Poor levels of job satisfaction
- Lower perceived levels of corporate social responsibility
- Raised staff turnover
- Absenteeism
- Heightened level of workplace conflict – arguments, yelling, rudeness, divide and conquer
- Counterproductive work behavior

=== Counterproductive work behavior ===
Boddy suggests that because of abusive supervision by corporate psychopaths, large amounts of anti-company feeling will be generated among the employees of the organisations that corporate psychopaths work in. This should result in high levels of counterproductive behaviour as employees give vent to their anger with the corporation, which they perceive to be acting through its corporate psychopathic managers in a way that is eminently unfair to them.

According to a 2017 UK study, a high ranking corporate psychopath could trigger lower ranked staff to become workplace bullies as a manifestation of counterproductive work behavior.

== Psychopathy and the 2008 financial crisis ==
Boddy makes the case that corporate psychopaths were instrumental in causing the 2008 financial crisis. He claims that the same corporate psychopaths who probably caused the crisis by greed and avarice are now advising government on how to get out of the crisis.

Psychologist Oliver James has described the credit crunch as a "mass outbreak of corporate psychopathy which resulted in something that very nearly crashed the whole world economy".

For example, during the 2008 financial crisis, the behaviour of some key people at the top of the world's largest banks came under scrutiny. At the time of its collapse in 2008 the Royal Bank of Scotland was the world's fifth largest bank by market capitalisation. CEO Fred "the Shred" Goodwin was known for taking excessive risks and showing little concern for his mismanagement, which led to the bank's collapse. Goodwin's demeanour toward colleagues was unpredictable and he is said to have lived a luxury lifestyle while fostering a culture of fear.

Renowned psychotherapist Professor Manfred F. R. Kets de Vries singled out Goodwin and former Barclays CEO Bob Diamond as exhibiting psychopathic behaviours in his working paper on the SOB, "seductive operational bully – or psychopath lite".

== Screening ==
From an organizational perspective, organizations can insulate themselves from the organizational psychopath by taking the following steps when recruiting:

- conduct behavioral type interview
- verify information contained in the curriculum vitae
- conduct reference checks
- obtain work samples
- carry out criminal reference checks

The following tests could be used to screen psychopaths:

- Psychopathy Checklist: Screening Version (PCL: SV)
- Psychopathy Measure – Management Research Version (PM-MRV)
- Business-Scan (B-SCAN) test

There have been anecdotal reports that at least one UK bank was using a psychopathy measure to actively recruit psychopaths.

Research findings based on the PM-MRV may have little relevance to medical psychopathy.

== Workplace bullying overlap ==
Narcissism, lack of self-regulation, lack of remorse, and lack of conscience have been identified as traits displayed by bullies. These traits are shared with psychopaths, indicating that there is some theoretical cross-over between bullies and psychopaths. Bullying is used by corporate psychopaths as a tactic to humiliate subordinates. Bullying is also used as a tactic to scare, confuse and disorient those who may be a threat to the activities of the corporate psychopath. Using meta data analysis on hundreds of UK research papers, Boddy concluded that 36% of bullying incidents were caused by the presence of corporate psychopaths. According to Boddy, there are two types of bullying:

- Predatory bullying – the bully just enjoys bullying and tormenting vulnerable people for the sake of it.
- Instrumental bullying – the bullying is for a purpose, helping the bully achieve his or her goals.

People with high scores on a psychopathy rating scale are more likely to engage in bullying, crime, and drug use than other people. Hare and Babiak noted that about 29% of corporate psychopaths are also bullies. Other research has also shown that people with high scores on a psychopathy rating scale were more likely to engage in bullying, again indicating that psychopaths tend to be bullies in the workplace.

A workplace bully or abuser will often have issues with social functioning. These types of people often have psychopathic traits that are difficult to identify in the hiring and promotion process. These individuals often lack anger management skills and have a distorted sense of reality. Consequently, when confronted with the accusation of abuse, the abuser is not aware that any harm was done. Team ethics and values prevent, detect, and correct bullying and mobbing in the workplace.

== See also ==
- Abusive supervision
- Machiavellianism in the workplace
- Narcissism in the workplace
- Occupational health psychology
