= Machiavellianism in the workplace =

Concept in organizational psychology

Machiavellianism in the workplace is a concept studied by many organizational psychologists. Conceptualized originally by Richard Christie and Florence Geis, Machiavellianism in psychology refers to a personality trait construct based on a cold, callous and exploitative orientation. It has been adapted and applied to the context of the workplace and organizations by psychology academics. Oliver James wrote on the effects of Machiavellianism and other dark triad personality traits in the workplace, the others being narcissism and psychopathy.

== Characteristics ==
Research has identified several characteristic unethical behaviors that commonly manifest in those who score high in Machiavellianism, including engaging in theft, practicing deception and dishonesty, deliberately sabotaging others' work, and participating in various forms of cheating to gain advantages.

High Machs can exhibit high levels of charisma, and their leadership can be beneficial in some areas. The presence of Machiavellianism in an organization's employees has been positively correlated with counterproductive workplace behavior and workplace deviance. The origin of exploitative tactics entering the workplace can be tied to multiple factors, such as distrust towards others, pessimism, survival/self-protection tactics, or even the gender of involved parties.

A new interpretation of how MACH levels specifically affects organizational contexts, encompasses three key elements: the assertion and maintenance of workplace authority, the implementation of severe management practices, and the employment of manipulative behavioral strategies to achieve desired outcomes.

The Dark Triad personality traits correlate with distinct influence tactics in workplace settings. Psychopathy correlates with threat-based tactics, while Machiavellianism correlates with charm and overt manipulation of people and situations. Narcissism correlates with using physical appearance as an influence tactic. The Dark Triad traits showed stronger intercorrelations when measuring hard (forceful/aggressive) tactics compared to soft tactics. This suggests these personality traits facilitate workplace influence primarily through aggressive and forceful methods rather than subtle approaches.

=== Leadership ===
The leadership of High Machs tends to be more unethical and destructive than other types of leadership. Unconstructive behaviors may appear in the workplace due to signals being sent from leaders to their employees. According to the findings of a study conducted in 2016, there was a particular relationship between low-ethical leadership behaviors and higher levels of manipulative behaviors from their followers. However, the followers do not need to have high levels of Machiavellianism. This suggests that these negative behaviors could be unintentional and are a result of employees trying to fulfill their workplace responsibilities.

High levels of Machiavellianism among leaders have been positively associated with higher ratings of abusive supervision among regular workers, contributing to low job satisfaction, which results in a negative impact on the workers' well-being. It has also been documented that employees who are high in Machiavellianism may participate in knowledge hiding, a technique of withholding or hiding knowledge from co-workers. This could then lead to damage in co-worker relations and distrust in the workplace. Furthermore, employees high in Machiavellianism may not only target their co-workers but also their supervisors. According to previous study findings, employees high in Machiavellianism may engage in emotionally manipulative behaviors toward their supervisors, especially those low on ethical leadership.

A research paper concluded that employees high on Machiavellianism who experienced the leadership from high Machs showed significantly decreased trust in their leaders. The study found a direct effect of employee Machiavellianism on trust and stress, with an indirect effect of trust on employee stress, but did not find substantial evidence for a conditional indirect effect on unethical work behaviors.

=== Counterproductive work behaviors ===
Research examining relationships between Machiavellianism, emotional manipulation, counterproductive work behaviors (CWBs) used construct replication methodology across two Amazon Mechanical Turk samples. Different measurement instruments across samples showed Machiavellianism positively correlates with CWBs and emotional manipulation. Emotional manipulation was identified as a mediating factor between Machiavellianism and CWBs. Personality traits such as agreeableness, conscientiousness, emotional stability, emotional intelligence—emotional control capabilities weakened the indirect effect of Machiavellianism on CWBs through emotional manipulation. Self-reported political skill strengthened this relationship. Emotional manipulation serves as a mechanism for Machiavellianism manifesting in negative workplace behaviors. This relationship can be moderated by personality characteristics and interpersonal skills.

Given the detrimental impact of counterproductive work behavior (CWB) in workplace settings, researchers analyzed how Machiavellianism influences the relationship between role conflict and CWB in Chinese organizations. Data collected across three phases demonstrated that role conflict triggered CWB through emotional exhaustion, with Machiavellianism serving as a buffering factor. Employees scoring higher in Machiavellianism showed a weaker connection between role conflict and emotional exhaustion, ultimately resulting in a reduced likelihood of engaging in CWB when faced with role conflicts.

=== Job satisfaction ===
Machiavellianism and psychopathy showed negative correlations with job satisfaction, with perceived competitiveness mediating these relationships.

=== Impact on employee satisfaction and well being ===
Being under the leadership of those high on Machiavellianism can negatively impact the performance or productivity inside an organization. A study showed a link between job satisfaction and level of Machiavellianism, in which the higher the level of MACH orientation by upper management and leaders, the higher the chance of employees experiencing lower job satisfaction. In the same study, it was found that managers with high levels of Machiavellianism also reported higher job strain, less job satisfaction, and fewer perceived opportunities for formal control in the work environment.

Research has shown that high levels of Machiavellianism, both exuding the traits and witnessing the traits in the workplace, correlate with higher levels of job strain, lower levels of job satisfaction, and lower levels of overall career satisfaction.

Perceived actions of Machiavellianism can cause significant stress and lead to distrust among employees and leaders. This can be due to the manipulative behaviors, low empathy, and self-focused motives that individuals high in Machiavellianism may exude in their workplaces. As a result of being potential victims of these behaviors, employees may experience a lack of trust, higher levels of stress, and a lower sense of commitment to the workplace.

Bullying in the workplace is another problem that can arise from Machiavellianism and that can contribute to stress levels among workers. A study shows a correlation between workplace bullying experiences and Machiavellianism levels, which usually results in lower job satisfaction among those workers being a victim of workplace bullying.

== Career choices and advancement ==
Individuals high in machiavellianism tend to gravitate towards particular careers, especially those that require a high degree of competitiveness needed to succeed. High Machs are ambitious enough to cut corners and use aggressive means if it is necessary to get ahead in their careers. One study found that "Machiavellianism was positively related to leadership position and career satisfaction". Individuals high in machiavellianism are especially drawn to leadership and management positions, which became an important subject in the primary literature. Sales careers also attract dark triad individuals, with one study stating that such individuals are "prevalent" in the industry. One study noted that those who possess high Machiavellianism levels "are more productive but received lower overall managerial ratings", and that "Machiavellianism may in certain circumstances, be somewhat advantageous for long-term sales performance." Machiavellianism was also associated with the use of "hard" (i.e. aggressive and hostile behavior) and "soft" (i.e. joking/kidding, offering compliments) tactics in the workforce. One's political skill in the workplace and elsewhere may even mask the behaviors and characteristics associated with machiavellianism. It was shown that those high on Machiavellianism are more drawn to academic majors like economics, law, and politics, as opposed to the "person-oriented" majors like education, nursing, and social work that were associated with lower Machiavellianism scores.

== Workplace success ==
Research examining leaders' Dark Triad traits and their impact on subordinate outcomes revealed that leader Machiavellianism and psychopathy negatively affect subordinates' career success and well-being. Individuals high in MACH found it easier to obtain leadership positions, and a better salary. Research has shown that one's level of Machiavellianism can be a major factor in situations where workplace manipulation is involved because this trait can have an effect on the ability for an individual to "fit" into a highly political work environment. Research has found individuals with Dark Triad traits are drawn to entrepreneurship. Certain qualities found in the Dark Triad are similar to traits needed for effective entrepreneurship, such as confidence, charisma and risk taking.

== Job interviews ==
Individuals who are high in Machiavellianism may be more willing and more skilled in deceiving and less likely to give honest answers during interviews. Additionally, those higher on machiavellianism have stronger intentions to use deception in interviews compared to psychopaths or narcissists and are also more likely to perceive the use of lying in interviews as fair. Furthermore, men and women high in Machiavellianism may use different tactics to influence interviewers. According to a study, which examined how much applicants allowed the interviewers to direct the topics covered during the interview stated that women high in Machiavellianism tended to allow interviewers more freedom to direct the content of the interview, whereas men high in Machiavellianism gave interviewers the least amount of freedom in directing the content of the interview. Men high in Machiavellianism were also more likely to make up information about themselves or their experiences during job interviews. On the other hand, an interviewer or human resource person high in Machiavellianism is likely to manipulate or lie or change his or her words during an interview or job hiring process.

== Workplace bullying overlap ==
Individuals scoring high in Machiavellianism tend to manipulate and exploit others to further their own agendas and maintain interpersonal dominance. Research indicates that individuals scoring highly on Machiavellianism commonly engage in various forms of workplace misconduct, including withholding critical information from colleagues, strategically undermining others' reputations with management, failing to fulfill their professional responsibilities, and engaging in the dissemination of false information about their coworkers.

According to previous studies there was a positive correlation between Machiavellianism and increased involvement in workplace bullying. Furthermore, the groups of bullies and bully-victims had a higher Machiavellianism level compared to the groups of victims and persons non-involved in bullying. The results showed that being bullied was negatively related to the perceptions of clan and adhocracy cultures and positively related to the perceptions of hierarchy culture. Apart from these, another research showed that Machiavellianism was positively associated with subordinate perceptions of abusive supervision (an overlapping concept with workplace bullying).

A study conducted in Poland examined the relationship between workplace bullying (from both victim and perpetrator perspectives), employee Machiavellianism, and perceptions of organizational culture using the Cameron and Quinn framework. The research, which surveyed 117 employees across various Polish organizations, utilized self-reporting methods to gather data on bullying experiences and perpetration. The findings confirmed that Machiavellianism was predictive of bullying behavior, with both bullies and bully-victims demonstrating higher levels of Machiavellianism compared to victims and non-involved individuals. Through moderated regression analysis, Machiavellianism was identified as a significant moderator in the relationship between perceptions of both adhocracy and hierarchy cultures and bullying victimization.

== See also ==
- Narcissism in the workplace
- Psychopathy in the workplace
- Occupational health psychology
