= Michael Maccoby =

American psychoanalyst and anthropologist (1933–2022)

- Born: March 5, 1933; Mt. Vernon, New York, U.S.
- Died: November 5, 2022 (aged 89); Washington, D.C., U.S.
- Occupations: Author, Psychoanalyst, Anthropologist
- Website: Personal Website

Michael Maccoby (March 5, 1933 – November 5, 2022) was an American psychoanalyst and anthropologist globally recognized as an expert on leadership for his research in improving organizations and the nature of work. He authored or co-authored several books and consulted to companies, governments, the World Bank, unions, research and development centers and laboratories, universities and orphanages or taught in 36 countries. Maccoby's article, Narcissistic Leaders: the Incredible Pros, the Inevitable Cons written in January 2000, was awarded a McKinsey Award from the Harvard Business Review.

== Life, education, and family ==
Maccoby was born in Mt. Vernon, New York, on March 5, 1933, to his father, who was a reform rabbi, and his mother who was a teacher. Maccoby attended public school in Mt. Vernon at the Brandes School in Tucson, Arizona, with the exception of two years. He graduated from A.B. Davis High School where he was awarded the General von Steuben Medal for Excellence in American History. He received a BA (magna cum laude) at Harvard University in 1954 where he was president of The Harvard Crimson. He then studied philosophy with Stuart Hampshire and Bernard Williams at New College, Oxford on a Woodrow Wilson Fellowship.

As a graduate student at Harvard he was a teaching fellow and secretary to the Committee on Educational Policy at the faculty of Arts and Sciences. He received a PhD from Harvard in Social Relations (combining social psychology and personality with anthropology) in June 1960. At Harvard, he worked with David Riesman, Jerome Bruner, B.F. Skinner, and McGeorge Bundy, and also studied with the anthropologist Clyde Kluckhohn. At the University of Chicago he studied with the anthropologist Robert Redfield and the psychoanalyst Bruno Bettelheim. While there he also studied Machiavelli with the political philosopher Leo Strauss. He married Sandylee Weille in 1959. Between 1960 and 1968 they lived in Mexico, while Maccoby worked with Dr. Erich Fromm.

Maccoby died from a heart attack in Washington, D.C., on November 5, 2022, at the age of 89. He was predeceased by his wife Sandylee Weille (d.2019); they had 4 children, Annie Maccoby-Berglof, Nora Maccoby-Hathaway, Izette Maccoby Folger, and Max Maccoby.

== Bibliography ==
- Maccoby, Michael, and Mauricio Cortina, eds. Leadership, Psychoanalysis, and Society. New York, Routledge, 2022.
- Maccoby, Michael and Ken Fuchsman, eds. Psychoanalytic and Historical Perspectives on the Leadership of Donald Trump: Narcissism and Marketing in an Age of Anxiety and Distrust. New York: Routledge, 2020
- Maccoby, Michael, with Tim Scudder. The Leaders We Need and What Makes Us Follow, 2nd Edition. Carlsbad, CA: Personal Strengths Publishing, 2017.
- Maccoby, Michael. Strategic Intelligence: Conceptual Tools for Leading Change. Oxford: Oxford University Press, 2015
- Maccoby, Michael, Clifford L. Norman, C. Jane Norman and Richard Margolies. Transforming Health Care Leadership: A Systems Guide to Improve Patient Care, Decrease Costs, and Improve Population Health. San Francisco: Jossey-Bass, 2013
- Maccoby, Michael. The Leaders We Need And What Makes Us Follow. Boston: Harvard Business School Press, 2007. This argues that with historic changes in work, family structure, and society, conceptions of leadership need to be revised. Followers no longer respond positively to autocratic paternalistic figures. Discusses types of leaders needed in knowledge and service work, and what these leaders can do so others want to follow.
- Maccoby, Michael. Narcissistic Leaders: Who Succeeds and Who Fails. Boston: Harvard Business School Press, 2007. This is "The Productive Narcissist" with a new introduction.
- Maccoby, Michael. The Productive Narcissist, the Promise and Peril of Visionary Leadership. New York: Broadway Books, 2003.
- Heckscher, Charles and Michael Maccoby, Rafael Ramirez, and Pierre-Eric Tixier. Agents of Change Crossing the Post-Industrial Divide. Oxford: Oxford University Press, 2003. This describes Maccoby's work with AT&T and the Communication Workers of America in designing Workplace of the Future.
- Fromm, Erich and Michael Maccoby. Social Character in a Mexican Village. Englewood Cliffs: Prentice-Hall, 1970. New Brunswick, NJ: Transaction Publishers, 1996. This is the report of a study showing the relationship between psychological factors, culture, productive work and social pathology.
- Cortina, Mauricio and Michael Maccoby, editors. A Prophetic Analyst: Erich Fromm's Contributions to Psychoanalysis. Northvale, NJ: Jason Aronson, 1996. This is a collection of essays on the influence of Erich Fromm.
- Maccoby, Michael. Why Work?: Motivating the New Workforce, Second edition of Why Work. Alexandria, VA: Miles River Press, 1995. This describes the different motivations that energize people at work. This book predicted the changing attitudes toward work in the technoservice economy.
- Maccoby, Michael, editor. Sweden At the Edge: Lessons For American and Swedish Managers. Philadelphia: University of Pennsylvania Press, 1991. This describes innovative Swedish management in the context of Swedish culture.
- Maccoby, Michael. Why Work: Leading the New Generation. New York: Simon and Schuster, 1988.
- Edstrom, Anders, Michael Maccoby, Lennart Stromberg, and Jan Erik Rendahl. Leadership for Sweden. Lund, Sweden: Liber, 1985. This reports interviews with Swedish Leaders in government, business, unions, military and public administration. It proposes the kind of leader needed in Sweden.
- Maccoby, Michael. The Leader: A New Face for American Management. New York: Simon and Schuster, 1981. This describes leaders in projects Maccoby was directing or participating in to improve productivity and the quality of working life in the US, UK, and Sweden.
- Maccoby, Michael. The Gamesman: The New Corporate Leaders. New York: Simon and Schuster,1976. This is the best-selling study of the managers creating new technology. It was translated into ten languages.
- Maccoby, Michael. Social Character and Social Change in Mexico and the United States. Cuernavaca: CIDOC, 1970. This is a collection of published articles on social character, methods of teaching, psychoanalysis and religion.

== See also ==
- Narcissistic leadership
