= Rensis Likert =

American social psychologist (1903–1981)

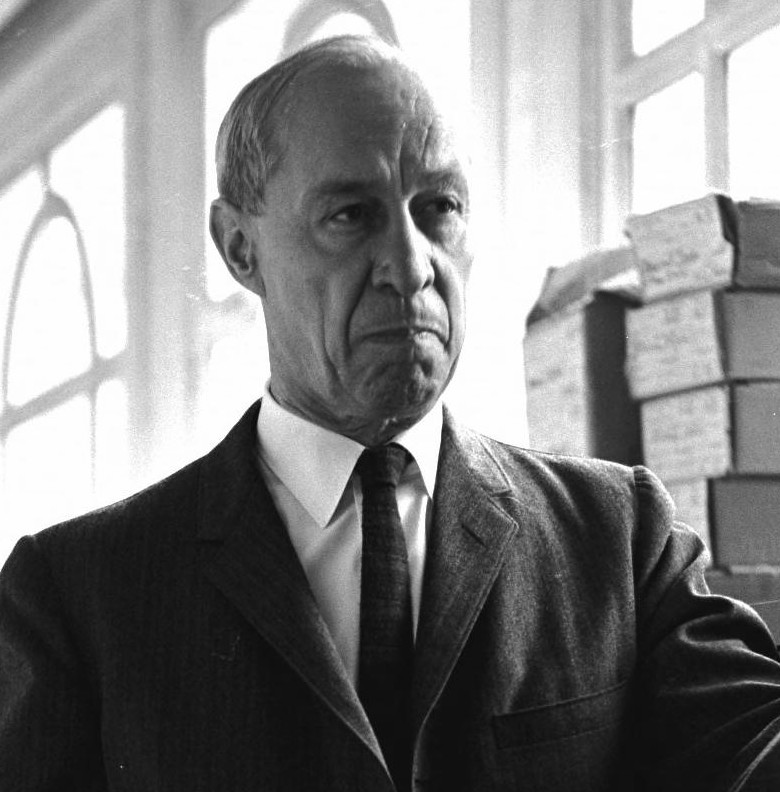
- Likert at the University of Michigan Institute for Social Research in 1961
- Born: August 5, 1903; Cheyenne, Wyoming, US
- Died: September 3, 1981 (aged 78); Ann Arbor, Michigan, US
- Resting place: Forest Hill Cemetery (Ann Arbor, Michigan) (Lot 50, Number 8)
- Education: University of Michigan; Columbia University
- Employer(s): USDA; University of Michigan
- Known for: Likert Scale, Likert's Management Systems, Linking pin model
- Spouse: Jane Gibson Likert

Rensis Likert (/ˈlɪkərt/ LIK-ərt; August 5, 1903 – September 3, 1981) was an American organizational and social psychologist known for developing the Likert scale, a psychometrically sound scale based on responses to multiple questions. The scale has become a method to measure people's thoughts and feelings from opinion surveys to personality tests. Likert also founded the theory of participative management, which is used to engage employees in the workplace. Likert's contributions in psychometrics, research samples, and open-ended interviewing have helped form and shape social and organizational psychology.

In 1926, Likert earned a B.A. in Economics and Sociology from the University of Michigan; in 1932 he earned a Ph.D. in Psychology from Columbia University. He worked for the U.S. Department of Agriculture until 1946. During World War II, Likert transitioned to working for the Office of War Information (OWI). At the OWI, he was appointed head of the United States Strategic Bombing Survey Morale Division (USSBS) in 1944.

After retiring at the age of 67, he formed Rensis Likert Associates, an institution based on his theories of management in organizational psychology. He is the author of numerous books about management, conflict, and behavioral research applications, including Human Organization: Its Management and Value and New Ways of Managing Conflict.

== Early life and education ==
Rensis Likert was born in 1903 to George Herbert Likert and Cornelia Zonna Adrianna (Cora) Likert in Cheyenne, Wyoming. Influenced by his father, an engineer with the Union Pacific Railroad, Likert studied civil engineering at the University of Michigan in Ann Arbor. He also worked as an intern with the Union Pacific Railroad during the Great Railroad Strike of 1922, which sparked his interest in studying organizational behavior.

After three years majoring in civil engineering, Likert switched to economics and sociology due to the influence of professor Robert Angell. Likert received a B.A. in sociology at the University of Michigan in 1926. Upon graduation, he studied theology at the Union Theological Seminary for a year. He then pursued doctoral study in psychology at Columbia University, where he was attracted to the nascent discipline of social psychology under Gardner Murphy. His 1932 Ph.D. dissertation, A Technique for the Measurement of Attitudes, developed the now well-known Likert scale. In 1938, he co-authored Public Opinion and the Individual with his mentor at Columbia, Gardner Murphy.

== Career ==
=== Life Insurance Agency Management Association ===
In 1935, Likert became Director of Research for the Life Insurance Agency Management Association (LIAMA) in Hartford, Connecticut. There, Likert began a research program to compare and evaluate the effectiveness of different modes of supervision. The research lead to the development of the three volumes of moral and agency management.

=== United States Department of Agriculture ===
In 1939, Likert was invited by Henry Wallace to organize the Division of Program Surveys (DPS) at the Bureau of Agriculture Statistics (BAS). Its purpose was to gather farmers' thoughts about USDA-sponsored New Deal programs and to combat the effects of the Great Depression. During World War II, as the director of the Program Surveys Division in the USDA's Bureau of Agricultural Economics (BAE), Likert ran surveys for the USDA. But as the war progressed, the division ran program surveys for multiple government agencies, including the Office of War Information, the U.S. Department of the Treasury, the Federal Reserve Board, and the U.S. Strategic Bombing Survey. In 1943, he developed the first national geographic sampling frame. During the war, Likert recruited other social psychologists into the growing government survey department.

=== The War Effort ===
On December 7, 1941, Likert gained support from the federal government on his program survey. From this the National survey was introduced which helped the federal government make decision on World War II. There were new interviews and sample methods that were the outcome of the program survey through the support of the federal government and other agencies.

=== Institute for Social Research ===
After the end of the war, the Department of Agriculture was forced by Congress to stop its social survey work. Likert and his team (many of them academics on temporary wartime duty) decided to move to a university. They accepted an offer in the summer of 1946 from the University of Michigan to form the Survey Research Center (SRC). In 1949, when Dorwin Cartwright moved the Center for Group Dynamics from MIT to the University of Michigan in 1949, the SRC became the Institute for Social Research (ISR). Likert was the director of the ISR from 1949 until his retirement in 1970.

=== Rensis Likert Associates ===
Upon retirement, Likert founded Rensis Likert Associates to consult for numerous corporations. He also helped start the Institute for Corporate Productivity. During his tenure at the Institute for Corporate Productivity, Likert devoted particular attention to research on organizations. During the 1960s and 1970s, his books on management theory were closely studied in Japan and their impact can be seen across modern Japanese organizations. He completed research on major corporations around the world, and his studies have accurately predicted the subsequent performance of the corporations.

== Personal life ==
On August 31, 1928, Likert married Jane Gibson (editor and consultant) while at Columbia University, having met at the University of Michigan. They had two daughters: Elizabeth David Likert and Patricia Pohlman Likert. In 1969, Likert retired as Director of the Institute for Social Research. The couple moved to Honolulu, Hawaii, where he formed Rensis Likert Associates.

== Death ==
Likert died at 78 years of age on September 3, 1981, in Ann Arbor, Michigan.

== Contributions ==
=== Open-ended interviewing ===
Likert contributed to the field of psychometrics by developing open-ended interviewing, a technique used to collect information about a person's thoughts, experiences, and preferences. It was common in the 1930s for researchers to use objective, closed-ended questions for the coding process to be valid. While this technique was used well in many domains, Likert saw the need for more opportunities to ask people about their attitudes towards various issues. Within open-ended interviewing, he and his colleagues invented the "funneling technique", which is a way to keep the interview open for comments, but directed in a specific way. The interview would begin with open-ended questions but gradually move into more narrowed questions. Today, open-ended interviewing is largely used in research studies where there is a need to understand people's attitudes.

=== Likert scale ===
Likert is best known for the Likert scale. Likert created the method in 1932 as part of his Ph.D. thesis to identify the extent of a person's attitudes and feelings towards international affairs. The Likert scale is used in conducting surveys, with applications to business-related areas such as marketing or customer satisfaction, the social sciences, and attitude-related research projects.

A Likert scale consists of the sum or average of scores from responses to a group of survey questions. These scores are transformed into a scale score through psychometric methods.

== Management systems ==
Likert developed his theory of management systems in the 1950s. He outlined a way of describing typical relationships, degree of involvement, and the roles of managers and subordinates in industrial settings. Four clusters of arrangements are identified. These "management systems" are known as:

1. Exploitative Authoritative
2. Benevolent Authoritative
3. Consultative System
4. Participative System.

== Professional achievements ==
- 1932 — Developed the Likert Scale
- 1944 — Appointed head of the United States Strategic Bombing Survey Morale Division (USSBS) (1944)
- 1949 — Fellow of the American Statistical Association
- 1959 — President, American Statistical Association
- 1967 — Honorary degree from Tilburg University, Netherlands
- Developed Open-ended Interviewing
- Developed scales for attitude measurement
- Developed the funneling technique for interviewing
- Introduced Participative management

== Books (Timeline) ==
Author and co-editor of 11 books

- Correlation and Machine Computation (1931)
- Technique for the Measurement of Professional Attitudes (1932)
- Public Opinion and the Individual (1938)
- Moral and Agency Management (1940-1944)
- Developing patterns in management (American Management Association, 1955)
- Some applications of Behavioral Research (1957)
- The Presidents Column (1959)
- New Patterns of Management (1961)
- Human Organization: Its Management and Value (1967)
- New Ways of Managing Conflict (1976)
- A Method for Coping with Conflict in Problem Solving Groups (1978)
