= VDT =

VDT may refer to:

- Video display terminal, or computer terminal
- 2-Vinyl-4,6-diamino-1,3,5-triazine (vinyl triazine), an organic compound
- Vulnerable Dark Triad, a subset under the Dark Triad psychological theory of personality
