= 2-Vinyl-4,6-diamino-1,3,5-triazine =

Names
- Preferred IUPAC name 6-Ethenyl-1,3,5-triazine-2,4-diamine
- Other names 2,4-diamino-6-vinyl-s-triazine, 2-vinyl-4,6-diamino-1,3,5-triazine, VDT

Identifiers
CAS Number	3194-70-5
3D model (JSmol)	Interactive image
ChemSpider	509517
ECHA InfoCard	100.102.330
EC Number	424-800-8
PubChem CID	586156
CompTox Dashboard (EPA)	DTXSID60342953
- InChI: InChI=1S/C5H7N5/c1-2-3-8-4(6)10-5(7)9-3/h2H,1H2,(H4,6,7,8,9,10) Key: ZXLYUNPVVODNRE-UHFFFAOYSA-N
- SMILES: C=CC1=NC(=NC(=N1)N)N

Properties
Chemical formula	C_{5}H_{7}N_{5}
Molar mass	137.146 g·mol^{−1}
Appearance	white solid
Melting point	239–241 °C (462–466 °F; 512–514 K)
- Except where otherwise noted, data are given for materials in their standard state (at 25 °C [77 °F], 100 kPa). Infobox references

2-Vinyl-4,6-diamino-1,3,5-triazine is an organic compound with the formula (H_{2}NC)_{2}N_{3}CCH=CH_{2}. The molecule consists of a vinyl group (-CH=CH_{2}) attached to a 2,4-diaminotriazine. A colorless solid, it is a monomeric precursor to polymers with hydrogen-bonding substituents.
