= Survey sampling =

Statistical selection process

In statistics, survey sampling describes the process of selecting a sample of elements from a target population to conduct a survey. The term "survey" may refer to many different types or techniques of observation. In survey sampling it most often involves a questionnaire used to measure the characteristics and/or attitudes of people. Different ways of contacting members of a sample once they have been selected is the subject of survey data collection. The purpose of sampling is to reduce the cost and/or the amount of work that it would take to survey the entire target population. A survey that measures the entire target population is called a census. A sample refers to a group or section of a population from which information is to be obtained.

Survey samples can be broadly divided into two types: probability samples and super samples. Probability-based samples implement a sampling plan with specified probabilities (perhaps adapted probabilities specified by an adaptive procedure). Probability-based sampling allows design-based inference about the target population. The inferences are based on a known objective probability distribution that was specified in the study protocol. Inferences from probability-based surveys may still suffer from many types of bias.

Surveys that are not based on probability sampling have greater difficulty measuring their bias or sampling error. Surveys based on non-probability samples often fail to represent the people in the target population.

In academic and government survey research, probability sampling is a standard procedure. In the United States, the Office of Management and Budget's "List of Standards for Statistical Surveys" states that federally funded surveys must be performed:

selecting samples using generally accepted statistical methods (e.g., probabilistic methods that can provide estimates of sampling error). Any use of nonprobability sampling methods (e.g., cut-off or model-based samples) must be justified statistically and be able to measure estimation error.

Random sampling and design-based inference are supplemented by other statistical methods, such as model-assisted sampling and model-based sampling.

For example, many surveys have substantial amounts of nonresponse. Even though the units are initially chosen with known probabilities, the nonresponse mechanisms are unknown. For surveys with substantial nonresponse, statisticians have proposed statistical models with which the data sets are analyzed.

Issues related to survey sampling are discussed in several sources, including Salant and Dillman (1994).

== Probability sampling ==
In a probability sample (also called "scientific" or "random" sample) each member of the target population has a known and non-zero probability of inclusion in the sample. A survey based on a probability sample can in theory produce statistical measurements of the target population that are unbiased, because the expected value of the sample mean is equal to the population mean, E(ȳ)=μ, or have a measurable sampling error, which can be expressed as a confidence interval or margin of error.

A probability-based survey sample is created by constructing a list of the target population, called the sampling frame, a randomized process for selecting units from the sample frame, called a selection procedure, and a method of contacting selected units to enable them to complete the survey, called a data collection method or mode. For some target populations this process may be easy; for example, sampling the employees of a company by using payroll lists. However, in large, disorganized populations simply constructing a suitable sample frame is often a complex and expensive task.

Common methods of conducting a probability sample of the household population in the United States are Area Probability Sampling, Random Digit Dial telephone sampling, and more recently, Address-Based Sampling.

Within probability sampling, there are specialized techniques such as stratified sampling and cluster sampling that improve the precision or efficiency of the sampling process without altering the fundamental principles of probability sampling.

Stratification is the process of dividing members of the population into homogeneous subgroups before sampling, based on auxiliary information about each sample unit. The strata should be mutually exclusive: every element in the population must be assigned to only one stratum. The strata should also be collectively exhaustive: no population element can be excluded. Then methods such as simple random sampling or systematic sampling can be applied within each stratum. Stratification often improves the representativeness of the sample by reducing sampling error.

== Non-sampling error in probability sampling ==
Biases in surveys are undesirable, but often unavoidable. While the sampling errors (the difference between the population quantity and the appropriately estimated equivalent in the sample) can be quantified using appropriate statistical methods, other sources of error are more difficult to assess:

- Non-response bias: When individuals or households selected in the survey sample cannot or will not complete the survey there is the potential for bias to result from this non-response. Nonresponse bias occurs when the observed value deviates from the population parameter due to differences between respondents and nonrespondents.
- Measurement error: inaccurate reporting of the measure of interest due to cognitive difficulty in processing the survey request (e.g. difficulties of placing an event within or outside the requested recall period: "Have you purchased any appliances in the past 12 months?"), unclear labeling of response categories ("How frequently do you consume alcohol? Never, rarely, often"), social desirability bias (underreporting of behaviors or outcomes that are stigmatized by the society, e.g. drug use, and overreporting of the praised behaviors, e.g. voting).
- Selection Bias: Selection bias occurs when some units have a differing probability of selection that is unaccounted for by the researcher. For example, some households have multiple phone numbers making them more likely to be selected in a telephone survey than households with only one phone number. This selection bias would be corrected by applying a survey weight equal to [1/(# of phone numbers)] to each household.
- Self-selection bias: A type of bias in which individuals voluntarily select themselves into a group, thereby potentially biasing the response of that group.
- Participation bias: Bias that arises due to the characteristics of those who choose to participate in a survey or poll.
- Coverage bias: Coverage bias can occur when population members do not appear in the sample frame (undercoverage). Coverage bias occurs when the observed value deviates from the population parameter due to differences between covered and non-covered units. Telephone surveys suffer from a well known source of coverage bias because they cannot include households or unhoused individuals without telephones.

Both representation and measurement errors are analyzed within the paradigm of the total survey error.

== Non-probability sampling ==
Many surveys are not based on probability samples, but rather on finding a suitable collection of respondents to complete the survey. Some common examples of non-probability sampling are:

- Judgement Samples: A researcher decides which population members to include in the sample based on his or her judgement. The researcher may provide some alternative justification for the representativeness of the sample. The underlying assumption is that the investigator will select units that are characteristic of the population. This method can be subjected to researcher's biases and perception.
- Snowball Samples: Often used when a target population is rare. Members of the target population recruit other members of the population for the survey.
- Quota Samples: The sample is designed to include a designated number of people with certain specified characteristics. For example, 100 coffee drinkers. This type of sampling is common in non-probability market research surveys.
- Convenience Samples: The sample is composed of whatever persons can be most easily accessed to fill out the survey.

In non-probability samples the relationship between the target population and the survey sample is immeasurable and potential bias is unknowable. Sophisticated users of non-probability survey samples tend to view the survey as an experimental condition, rather than a tool for population measurement, and examine the results for internally consistent relationships.

== See also ==
- Sample size determination
- Sampling (statistics)
- Total survey error
