= Rake =

Rake may refer to:

== Common uses ==
- Rake (tool), a horticultural implement, a long-handled tool with tines
- Rake (stock character), a man habituated to immoral conduct
- Rake (poker), the commission taken by the house when hosting a poker game
- Raking fire, fire along the axis of a ship in naval warfare

== Arts and entertainment ==
=== Music ===
- Rake (band), a former American art rock/noise rock musical ensemble
- The Rakes, a former English post-punk band formed in 2003
- "Rake", a song by Sufjan Stevens from the 1999 album A Sun Came

=== Television ===
- Rake (Australian TV series), a 2010–2018 comedy-drama series
- Rake (American TV series), a 2014 adaptation of the Australian series

=== Other uses in arts and entertainment ===
- The Rake, a men's magazine
- The Rake, a creepypasta

== People ==
- Rake (surname), including a list of people with the name
- Rake (singer), a Japanese singer-songwriter
- Rake Yohn (Edward Webb, born 1975), American TV personality

== Places ==
- Rake, West Sussex, England
- Rake, Kostel, Slovenia
- Rake, Iowa, United States
- Rake Brook, a tributary of the River Roddlesworth in Lancashire, England

== Science and technology ==
- Rake (angle), several uses
- Rake angle, a parameter in machining and cutting geometry
- Rake (cellular automaton), an automaton that leaves behind a trail of debris
- Rake (software), a software task management and a build automation tool
- Rake (geology), the angle between a feature on a bedding plane and the strike line

== Transportation ==
- Rake, a measurement of steering axis angle in bicycle and motorcycle geometry
- Rake, the difference between front and rear ride heights of a car, created by wheel alignment
- Rake (train), a set of rolling stock coupled together

== Other uses ==
- Rake (architecture), the slope of the roof at the end of a gable
- Rake (theatre), a theatre stage that slopes upward away from the audience
- Rake, or hooker, a position in rugby league football
- Rake, a lock picking device

== See also ==
- Raking, a weighting method in statistics
- Reiki, a form of alternative medicine
- Rake receiver, a radio receiver
- Mash rake, a tool in brewing
- The Rake of Rivera, a nickname for Italian tycoon Gianni Agnelli
