= Rake's Progress (disambiguation) =

A Rake's Progress is a series of eight paintings by British artist William Hogarth.

Rake's Progress may also refer to:

- The Rake's Progress, an opera by Igor Stravinsky based on the paintings
- The Rake's Progress (ballet), a ballet based on the paintings
- The Rake's Progress (film), a 1945 British film directed by Sidney Gilliat
- "The Rakes Progress", a song by Marillion from Holidays in Eden

== See also ==
- Rake (disambiguation)
- Progress (disambiguation)
