= Rake (angle) =

Angle of slope relative to horizontal

Rake describes the angle made by a sloped surface with respect to a horizontal or vertical reference. The usages of this term include:

- A motorcycle or bicycle fork rake, the angle at which the forks are angled down towards the ground
- Rake angle in machining and sawing, the angle of a cutting head
- Rake (geology), the angle at which one rock moves against another in a geological fault
- Rake (theatre), the slope of a stage angled towards the audience for a better view

== See also ==
- Rake (disambiguation)
- Pitch angle (kinematics), the amount by which a vehicle is tilted around a side-to-side axis
