= Kish grid =

The Kish grid or Kish selection grid is a method for selecting members within a household to be interviewed. It uses a pre-assigned table of random numbers to find the person to be interviewed. It was developed by statistician Leslie Kish in 1949.

It is a technique widely used in survey research.
