= Daniel G. Horvitz =

American survey statistician (1921-2008)

Daniel Goodman Horvitz (March 4, 1921 – June 1, 2008) was an American survey statistician, best known for the eponymous Horvitz-Thompson estimator.

== Early life and career ==
Daniel (Dan) Horvitz was born in New Bedford, Massachusetts. He graduated with a B.S. in mathematics from the University of Massachusetts and earned a Ph.D. in statistics at Iowa State University in 1953.

== Horvitz-Thompson estimator ==
Horvitz (together with Donovan J. Thompson) co-authored in 1952 a research paper that introduced what was later called the Horvitz-Thompson estimator. In the paper, an unbiased estimator for a total is proposed, given a random sample without replacement with (possibly) unequal selection probabilities of the sample units. The authors also provide a formula for the variance of this estimator and a method to unbiasedly estimate this variance. The Horvitz-Thompson estimator is still in use in modern survey statistics; the paper was therefore regarded a landmark paper in survey statistics by the International Association of Survey Statisticians.

== Later career ==
Over the years, Horvitz taught at the University of Pittsburgh, at North Carolina State University and at UNC-Chapel Hill. In 1962, he joined the Research Triangle Institute (today RTI International), rising to executive vice president in 1983. During his time with RTI, Horvitz was involved in the design of several large scale survey projects, e.g. the National Assessment of Educational Progress, and contributed to the advancement of the Randomized Response technique to achieve reliable survey estimates for sensitive questions.

In 1990, when the National Institute of Statistical Sciences was founded, Horvitz served as the interim director. He was a former vice president and fellow of the American Statistical Association and received the Distinguished Service Award of the National Institute of Statistical Sciences. In 1993 Horvitz was awarded the American Statistical Association's Founders Award.

== Private life ==
Dan Horvitz was actively engaged in Jewish communities. He was a former trustee and president of the Blumenthal Jewish Home, now in Greensboro, North Carolina and a president (1988–1990) of the Jewish Federation of Raleigh-Cary. He died June 1, 2008, in Boca Raton, Florida, and was survived by his children Barbara, Gary and Paul.
