= Social multiplier effect =

Social concept

The social multiplier effect is a term used in economics, economic geography, sociology, public health and other academic disciplines to describe certain social externalities. It is based on the principle that high levels of one attribute amongst one's peers can have spillover effects on an individual. "This social multiplier can also be thought of as a ratio ∆P/∆I where ∆I is the average response of an individual action to an exogenous parameter (that affects only that person) and ∆P is the (per capita) response of the peer group to a change in the same parameter that affects the entire peer group." In other words, it is the ratio of an individual action to an exogenous parameter to the aggregate effect of the same parameter on the individual's peers.

For example, we know that health outcomes strongly correlate with education level. Given the social multiplier effect, we know that in the aggregate, if a poorly educated individual moves into a highly educated area they will experience some of the positive health effects associated with being more educated. It is important however to distinguish between 1) a local-average model or social norms, whereby certain attributes are adopted based on them being the socially normal behavior, and 2) a local-aggregate model or social multiplier effect whereby "peer effects are captured by the sum of friends' efforts in some activity." In the former an individual pays a price for deviating from a norm. In the latter, as an individual gains more peers who have a certain attribute, they will experience greater utility for adopting this attribute as well. The following are some examples of research on the social multiplier effect.

== Examples ==
Researchers Scott E. Carrell, Mark L. Hoekstra, and James E. West have shown that one's friends' fitness affects one's own fitness. They find that "each out-of-shape individual creates two additional out-of-shape individuals through their social interactions." Another researcher Jeffery Fletcher has found that a 10 percent increase in the number of students who smoke at a high school increases the chances another student will smoke by about 3 percent. Xiaodong Liu et al. have found that there is a multiplier effect for juvenile delinquency in schools. Additionally, in another article Carrell, West, and Frederick V. Malmstrom find that peer cheating increases the likelihood that an individual will cheat.

The social multiplier effect is of particular concern to researchers in economic geography. It is well documented that factors like income and education have strong positive correlations with many aspects of health. This is important because the geographic distribution of income and education is becoming increasingly stratified. For example, since 1980, on average, cities that had high levels of college educated workers are becoming increasingly college educated whereas those who had low levels are becoming increasingly less educated. The same trend applies to income. Consequently, as the distribution of income and education level becomes more disparate, many low income regions lose out on the social multiplier benefits they once enjoyed.

== Measurement challenges ==
Using only observational data, a researcher may find it impossible to disentangle social interactions within a group from other types of similarities within a group. This challenge to the identifiability of social multiplier effects is known in econometrics as the "reflection problem", following an influential 1993 paper by Charles F. Manski. Manski considers three types of hypotheses to explain why members of a group might behave similarly to each other:

- endogenous effects, in which group behavior affects individual behavior directly;
- exogenous effects or contextual effects, in which exogenously determined characteristics of the group affect individual behavior;
- correlated effects, in which group members only behave similarly because they have individual characteristics in common.

The three effects cannot be distinguished if the researcher does not know how groups are constructed, but only endogenous effects can produce social multipliers. Though Manski wrote that the reflection problem can only be overcome if the researcher has information on how individuals enter into groups, such as in an experimental setting, more recent work has highlighted alternative ways of overcoming the problem in common settings.

== See also ==
- Economic development
- Economic geography
- Local multiplier effect
- Network effects
- Spillover (experiment)
