= Multistage sampling =

Type of sampling strategy

In statistics, multistage sampling is the taking of samples in stages using smaller and smaller sampling units at each stage.

Multistage sampling can be a complex form of cluster sampling because it is a type of sampling which involves dividing the population into groups (or clusters). Then, one or more clusters are chosen at random and everyone within the chosen cluster is sampled.

Using all the sample elements in all the selected clusters may be prohibitively expensive or unnecessary. Under these circumstances, multistage cluster sampling becomes useful. Instead of using all the elements contained in the selected clusters, the researcher randomly selects elements from each cluster. Constructing the clusters is the first stage. Deciding what elements within the cluster to use is the second stage. The technique is used frequently when a complete list of all members of the population does not exist and is inappropriate.

In some cases, several levels of cluster selection may be applied before the final sample elements are reached. For example, household surveys conducted by the Australian Bureau of Statistics begin by dividing metropolitan regions into 'collection districts' and selecting some of these collection districts (first stage). The selected collection districts are then divided into blocks, and blocks are chosen from within each selected collection district (second stage). Next, dwellings are listed within each selected block, and some of these dwellings are selected (third stage). This method makes it unnecessary to create a list of every dwelling in the region and necessary only for selected blocks. In remote areas, an additional stage of clustering is used, in order to reduce travel requirements.

Although cluster sampling and stratified sampling bear some superficial similarities, they are substantially different. In stratified sampling, a random sample is drawn from all the strata, where in cluster sampling only the selected clusters are studied, either in single- or multi-stage.

Advantages

- Cost and speed that the survey can be done in
- Convenience of finding the survey sample
- Normally more accurate than cluster sampling for the same size sample

Disadvantages

- Not as accurate as Simple Random Sample if the sample is the same size
- More testing is difficult to do

== See also ==
- Statistics
