= Systematic sampling =

Statistical method for surveys

In survey methodology, one-dimensional systematic sampling is a statistical method. It involves the selection of elements from an ordered sampling frame. The most common form is equal probability sampling (also known as epsem), an equiprobability method. This applies in particular when the sampled units are individuals, households or corporations.

== Alternatives ==
When a geographic area is sampled for a spatial analysis, bi-dimensional systematic sampling on an area sampling frame can be applied.

== One-dimensional sampling ==
In one-dimensional systematic sampling, progression through the list is treated circularly, with a return to the top once the list ends. The sampling starts by selecting an element from the list at random and then every k^{th} element in the frame is selected, where k is the sampling interval (sometimes known as the skip): this is calculated as:

$$k = \frac Nn$$

where n is the sample size, and N is the population size.

Using this procedure each element in the population has a known and equal probability of selection. This makes systematic sampling functionally similar to simple random sampling (SRS). However, it is not the same, because not every possible sample of a certain size has an equal chance of emerging (e.g. samples with at least two elements adjacent to each other will never be chosen by systematic sampling). It is, however, much more efficient (if the variance within a systematic sample is more than the variance of the population).

Systematic sampling be used with non-equal selection probabilities. Each element can be given a spot along a number line according to its selection probability. The start is then generated from a uniform distribution between 0 and 1, and units are selected from along the number line in steps of 1.

Example: Given a population of 5 units (A to E) and a 20% probability of selection, unit B gets a 40% probability, and so on up to unit E (100%). Assuming alphabetical order, each unit is allocated to the following interval:

A: 0 to 0.2
B: 0.2 to 0.6 (= 0.2 + 0.4)
C: 0.6 to 1.2 (= 0.6 + 0.6)
D: 1.2 to 2.0 (= 1.2 + 0.8)
E: 2.0 to 3.0 (= 2.0 + 1.0)

With a random start at 0.156, the unit whose interval contains this number (i.e. A) is sampled. Next the interval containing 1.156 (element C) is sampled, then 2.156 (element E). If instead our random start was 0.350, points 0.350 (B), 1.350 (D), and 2.350 (E) are sampled.

== Restrictions ==
Systematic sampling is appropriate only if the population is logically homogeneous, because systematic sample units are uniformly distributed over the population. The researcher must ensure that the sampling interval does not hide a pattern. Any pattern would violate randomness.

== Example ==
From the sampling frame, a random starting point is chosen, and customers are chosen thereafter at regular intervals. For example, to sample 8 houses from a street of 120 houses. 120/8=15, so every 15th house is sampled based on a random starting point between 1 and 15. If the random starting point is 11, then houses 11, 26, 41, 56, 71, 86, 101, and 116 are sampled. As an aside, if every 15th house was a "corner house" then this pattern could destroy the sample's randomness.

If the population is not evenly divisible by the sample size (e.g., 8 houses out of 125, where 125/8=15.625), should the sample interval be 15 or 16? If the latter, it is possible that only 7 houses would be sampled If the former, none of the last five houses will be sampled. The correct interval is then 15.625. The starting point should be a real (decimal) number between 0 and 15.625 (inclusive on one endpoint only) to ensure that every house has an equal chance; each selection number is rounded up to the next integer. If the random starting point is 3.6, then the houses selected are 4, 20, 35, 50, 66, 82, 98, and 113, using 3 intervals rounding to 15 and 4 rounding to 16.

== Concealed patterns ==
To illustrate the danger of systematic skip concealing a pattern, consider a planned neighborhood where each street has ten houses per block. This places houses No. 1, 10, 11, 20, 21, 30... on block corners; corner blocks may be less (or more) valuable. Sampling every 10th household, will include either only corner houses (if we start at 1 or 10) or no corner houses (any other start); either way, it is not representative.

== See also ==
- Low-discrepancy sequence
