= Rake (surname) =

Rake is a surname. Notable people with the surname include:

- Alan Rake (born 1933), English journalist and writer
- Christer Rake (born 1987), Norwegian former professional Road Racing Cyclist
- Jeff Rake (born 1966), American television producer and writer
- Michael Rake (born 1948), British businessman
- Rodolfo Rake (born 1979), Peruvian former tennis player
