= Raking =

Concept in statistics

Raking (also called "raking ratio estimation" or "iterative proportional fitting") is the statistical process of adjusting data sample weights of a contingency table to match desired marginal totals.
