= Rake (geology) =

Angle at which one rock moves against another in a geological fault

In structural geology, rake (or pitch) is formally defined as "the angle between a line [or a feature] and the strike line of the plane in which it is found", measured on the plane. The three-dimensional orientation of a line can be described with just a plunge and trend. The rake is a useful description of a line because often (in geology) features (lines) follow along a planar surface. In these cases the rake can be used to describe the line's orientation in three dimensions relative to that planar surface. One might also expect to see this used when the particular line is hard to measure directly (possibly due to outcrops impeding measurement). The rake always sweeps down from the horizontal plane.

== Fault motion ==
Rake is used to describe the direction of fault motion with respect to the strike (measured anticlockwise from the horizontal, up is positive; values between −180° and 180°):

- left-lateral strike slip: rake near 0°
- right-lateral strike slip: rake near 180°
- normal: rake near −90°
- reverse/thrust: rake near +90°

== See also ==
- Strike and dip
