= Leslie Kish =

Hungarian-American statistician and survey methodologist

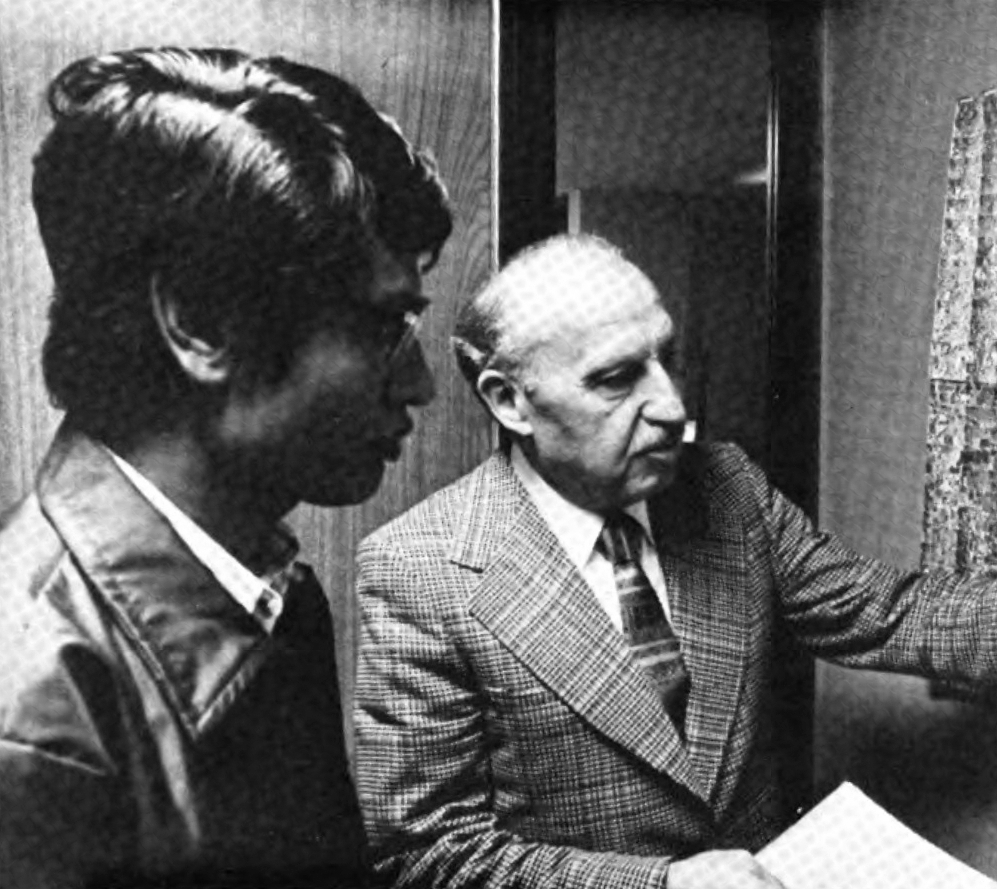
- Kish (right) c. 1976
- Born: July 27, 1910; Poprád, Austria-Hungary
- Died: October 7, 2000 (aged 90)
- Education: University of Michigan; City College of New York
- Known for: Kish grid
- Scientific career
- Fields: Statistics
- Workplaces: University of Michigan
- Doctoral advisor: Amos Hawley
- Military Service
- Allegiance: Spanish Republic
- Branch: International Brigades
- Unit: The "Abraham Lincoln" XV International Brigade
- Conflicts: Spanish Civil War

Leslie Kish (born László Kiss, July 27, 1910 – October 7, 2000) was a Hungarian-American statistician and survey methodologist.

== Life and career ==
Kish emigrated with his family to the US in 1925. His father soon died, and Kish helped support the family by working while continuing his studies in the evenings. In 1937 he volunteered for the International Brigade to fight against Francisco Franco in the Spanish Civil War. He saw action in a Hungarian battalion, was wounded, and returned to the United States in 1939. In 1939, he finished his baccalaureate in mathematics at the City College of New York.

He worked at the U.S. Bureau of the Census from 1940 until 1941, when he moved to the Division of Program Surveys of the Department of Agriculture. For the remainder of World War II he served as a meteorologist in the U.S. Army Air Corps. After the war he returned to the Department of Agriculture, but in 1947 he joined the University of Michigan faculty. He moved to the University of Michigan as a member of the newly created Survey Research Center, which in 1949 became a unit of the new Institute for Social Research (ISR). While working full-time, Kish received an M.A. in mathematical statistics in 1948 and a Ph.D. in sociology in 1952. He became a lecturer at the University of Michigan in 1951, an associate professor in 1956, a professor in 1960 and professor emeritus in 1981".

== Awards and honors ==
In 1997, the American Statistical Association gave Kish their Wilks Memorial Award. The award citation read: "For being a truly outstanding statistician, who has had a profound influence on sample survey practice throughout the world."

== Selected publications ==
- Kish, Leslie. Statistical Design for Research. New York: Wiley. 1987. ISBN 978-0471083597.
- Kish, Leslie (1965), Survey Sampling, New York: Wiley. ISBN 978-0471109495.
- Kish, L. (1949), "A Procedure for Objective Respondent Selection within the Household", Journal of the American Statistical Association, 44 (247): 380–387, doi:10.2307/2280236, JSTOR 2280236. On the basis of this paper, Kish's name is associated with the Kish grid.

== See also ==
- Kish grid
