= Sampling error =

Statistical error

In statistics, sampling errors are incurred when the statistical characteristics of a population are estimated from a subset, or sample, of that population. Since the sample does not include all members of the population, statistics of the sample (often known as estimators), such as means and quartiles, generally differ from the statistics of the entire population (known as parameters). The difference between the sample statistic and population parameter is called the sampling error. For example, if one measures the height of a thousand individuals from a population of one million, the average height of the thousand is typically not the same as the average height of all one million people in the country.

Since sampling is almost always done to estimate population parameters that are unknown, by definition exact measurement of the sampling errors will usually not be possible; however they can often be estimated, either by general methods such as bootstrapping, or by specific methods incorporating some assumptions (or guesses) regarding the true population distribution and parameters thereof.

== Description ==
=== Sampling error ===
The sampling error is the error caused by observing a sample instead of the whole population. The sampling error is the difference between a sample statistic used to estimate a population parameter and the actual but unknown value of the parameter.

=== Effective sampling ===
In statistics, a truly random sample means selecting individuals from a population with an equivalent probability; in other words, picking individuals from a group without bias. Failing to do this correctly will result in a sampling bias, which can dramatically increase the sample error in a systematic way. For example, attempting to measure the average height of the entire human population of the Earth, but measuring a sample only from one country, could result in a large over- or under-estimation. In reality, obtaining an unbiased sample can be difficult as many parameters (in this example, country, age, gender, and so on) may strongly bias the estimator and it must be ensured that none of these factors play a part in the selection process.

Even in a perfect non-biased sample, the sample error will still exist due to the remaining statistical component; consider that measuring only two or three individuals and taking the average would produce a wildly varying result each time. The likely size of the sampling error can generally be reduced by taking a larger sample.

=== Sample size determination ===
The cost of increasing a sample size may be prohibitive in reality. Since the sample error can often be estimated beforehand as a function of the sample size, various methods of sample size determination are used to weigh the predicted accuracy of an estimator against the predicted cost of taking a larger sample.

=== Bootstrapping and standard error ===
As discussed, a sample statistic, such as an average or percentage, will generally be subject to sample-to-sample variation. By comparing many samples, or splitting a larger sample up into smaller ones (potentially with overlap), the spread of the resulting sample statistics can be used to estimate the standard error on the sample.

== In genetics ==
The term "sampling error" has also been used in a related but fundamentally different sense in the field of genetics; for example in the bottleneck effect or founder effect, when natural disasters or migrations dramatically reduce the size of a population, resulting in a smaller population that may or may not fairly represent the original one. This is a source of genetic drift, as certain alleles become more or less common), and has been referred to as "sampling error", despite not being an "error" in the statistical sense.

== See also ==
- Margin of error
- Propagation of uncertainty
- Ratio estimator
- Sampling (statistics)
