= Statistical population =

Complete set of items that share at least one property in common

In statistics, a population is a set of similar items which is of interest for some question or experiment. A statistical population can be a group of existing objects (e.g. the set of all stars within the Milky Way galaxy) or a hypothetical and potentially infinite group of objects conceived as a generalization from experience (e.g. the set of all possible hands in a game of poker).

In statistical inference, the population is modelled by a probability distribution with unknown parameters. By analyzing a subset of the population, it is then possible to estimate the population parameters using the appropriate sample statistics.

== Mean ==
The population mean is the arithmetic mean of some numerical property across the entire population. Where the property under consideration is modelled by a random variable, the population mean refers to the expected value of that random variable. Not every probability distribution has a well-defined mean (see the Cauchy distribution for an example).

The sample mean may differ from the population mean, especially for small samples. The law of large numbers states that the larger the size of the sample, the more likely it is that the sample mean will be close to the population mean.

== See also ==
- Data collection system
- Horvitz–Thompson estimator
- Sample (statistics)
- Stratum (statistics)
- Bootstrap world
