= Social research =

Research conducted by social scientists

Social research is research conducted by social scientists following a systematic plan. Social research methodologies can be classified as quantitative and qualitative.

- Quantitative designs approach social phenomena through quantifiable evidence, and often rely on statistical analyses of many cases (or across intentionally designed treatments in an experiment) to create valid and reliable general claims.
- Qualitative designs emphasize understanding of social phenomena through direct observation, communication with participants, or analyses of texts, and may stress contextual subjective accuracy over generality.

Most methods contain elements of both. For example, qualitative data analysis often involves a fairly structured approach to coding raw data into systematic information and quantifying intercoder reliability. There is often a more complex relationship between "qualitative" and "quantitative" approaches than would be suggested by drawing a simple distinction between them.

Social scientists employ a range of methods in order to analyze a vast breadth of social phenomena: from analyzing census survey data derived from millions of individuals, to conducting in-depth analysis of a single agent's social experiences; from monitoring what is happening on contemporary streets, to investigating historical documents. Methods rooted in classical sociology and statistics have formed the basis for research in disciplines such as political science and media studies. They are also often used in program evaluation and market research.

== Methods ==
Social scientists are divided into camps of support for particular research techniques. These disputes relate to the historical core of social theory (positivism and antipositivism; structure and agency). While very different in many aspects, both qualitative and quantitative approaches involve a systematic interaction between theory and data. The choice of method often depends largely on what the researcher intends to investigate. For example, a researcher concerned with drawing a statistical generalization across an entire population may administer a survey questionnaire to a representative sample population. By contrast, a researcher who seeks full contextual understanding of an individual's social actions may choose ethnographic participant observation or open-ended interviews. Studies will commonly combine, or triangulate, quantitative and qualitative methods as part of a multi-strategy design.

== Sampling ==
Typically a population is very large, making a census or a complete enumeration of all the values in that population infeasible. A sample thus forms a manageable subset of a population. In positivist research, statistics derived from a sample are analysed in order to draw inferences regarding the population as a whole. The process of collecting information from a sample is referred to as sampling. Sampling methods may be either random (random sampling, systematic sampling, stratified sampling, cluster sampling) or non-random/nonprobability (convenience sampling, purposive sampling, snowball sampling). The most common reason for sampling is to obtain information about a population. Sampling is quicker and cheaper than a complete census of a population.

== Methodological assumptions ==
Social research is based on logic and empirical observations. Charles C. Ragin writes in his Constructing Social Research book that "Social research involved the interaction between ideas and evidence. Ideas help social researchers make sense of evidence, and researchers use evidence to extend, revise and test ideas." Social research thus attempts to create or validate theories through data collection and data analysis, and its goal is exploration, description, explanation, and prediction. It should never lead or be mistaken with philosophy or belief. Social research aims to find social patterns of regularity in social life and usually deals with social groups (aggregates of individuals), not individuals themselves (although science of psychology is an exception here). Research can also be divided into pure research and applied research. Pure research has no application on real life, whereas applied research attempts to influence the real world.

There are no laws in social science that parallel the laws in natural science. A law in social science is a universal generalization about a class of facts. A fact is an observed phenomenon, and observation means it has been seen, heard or otherwise experienced by researcher. A theory is a systematic explanation for the observations that relate to a particular aspect of social life. Concepts are the basic building blocks of theory and are abstract elements representing classes of phenomena. Axioms or postulates are basic assertions assumed to be true. Propositions are conclusions drawn about the relationships among concepts, based on analysis of axioms. Hypotheses are specified expectations about empirical reality derived from propositions. Social research involves testing these hypotheses to see if they are true.

Social research involves creating a theory, operationalization (measurement of variables) and observation (actual collection of data to test hypothesized relationship). Social theories are written in the language of variables, in other words, theories describe logical relationships between variables. Variables are logical sets of attributes, with people being the "carriers" of those variables, for example, gender can be a variable with two or more attributes: male, female and non-binary gender.

Variables are also divided into independent variables (data) that influences the dependent variables (which scientists are trying to explain). For example, in a study of how different dosages of a drug are related to the severity of symptoms of a disease, a measure of the severity of the symptoms of the disease is a dependent variable and the administration of the drug in specified doses is the independent variable. Researchers will compare the different values of the dependent variable (severity of the symptoms) and attempt to draw conclusions.

== Guidelines for "good research" ==
When social scientists speak of "good research" the guidelines refer to how the science is mentioned and understood. It does not refer to how what the results are but how they are figured. Glenn Firebaugh summarizes the principles for good research in his book Seven Rules for Social Research. The first rule is that "There should be the possibility of surprise in social research." As Firebaugh (p. 1) elaborates: "Rule 1 is intended to warn that you don't want to be blinded by preconceived ideas so that you fail to look for contrary evidence, or you fail to recognize contrary evidence when you do encounter it, or you recognize contrary evidence but suppress it and refuse to accept your findings for what they appear to say."

In addition, good research will "look for differences that make a difference" (Rule 2) and "build in reality checks" (Rule 3). Rule 4 advises researchers to replicate, that is, "to see if identical analyses yield similar results for different samples of people" (p. 90). The next two rules urge researchers to "compare like with like" (Rule 5) and to "study change" (Rule 6); these two rules are especially important when researchers want to estimate the effect of one variable on another (e.g. how much does college education actually matter for wages?). The final rule, "Let method be the servant, not the master," reminds researchers that methods are the means, not the end, of social research; it is critical from the outset to fit the research design to the research issue, rather than the other way around.

Explanations in social theories can be idiographic or nomothetic. An idiographic approach to an explanation is one where the scientists seek to exhaust the idiosyncratic causes of a particular condition or event, i.e. by trying to provide all possible explanations of a particular case. Nomothetic explanations tend to be more general with scientists trying to identify a few causal factors that impact a wide class of conditions or events. For example, when dealing with the problem of how people choose a job, idiographic explanation would be to list all possible reasons why a given person (or group) chooses a given job, while nomothetic explanation would try to find factors that determine why job applicants in general choose a given job.

Research in science and in social science is a long, slow and difficult process that sometimes produces false results because of methodological weaknesses and in rare cases because of fraud, so that reliance on any one study is inadvisable.

== Ethics ==
The ethics of social research are shared with those of medical research. In the United States, these are formalized by the Belmont report as:

=== Respect for persons ===
The principle of respect for persons holds that (a) individuals should be respected as autonomous agents capable of making their own decisions, and that (b) subjects with diminished autonomy deserve special considerations. A cornerstone of this principle is the use of informed consent.

=== Beneficence ===
The principle of beneficence holds that (a) the subjects of research should be protected from harm, and, (b) the research should bring tangible benefits to society. By this definition, research with no scientific merit is automatically considered unethical.

=== Justice ===
The principle of justice states the benefits of research should be distributed fairly. The definition of fairness used is case-dependent, varying between "(1) to each person an equal share, (2) to each person according to individual need, (3) to each person according to individual effort, (4) to each person according to societal contribution, and (5) to each person according to merit."

== Types of methods ==
The following list of research methods is not exhaustive:

Quantitative methods

- Cluster analysis
- Correlation and association
- Longitudinal study
- Multivariate statistics
- Econometrics
- Regression analysis
- Social network analysis
- Social sequence analysis
- Surveys and questionnaire
- Structural equation modeling
- Survey research
- Quantitative marketing research

Qualitative methods

- Archival research
- Analytic induction
- Case study
- Content analysis
- Ethnography
- Focus group
- Historical method
- Life history
- Morphological analysis
- Most significant change technique
- Participant observation
- Semi-structured interview
- Structured interview
- Textual analysis
- Unstructured interview

Mixed methods

- Delphi method
- Ladder interview
- Q methodology
- Repertory grid
- Triangulation (social science)

== Foundations of social research ==
=== Sociological positivism ===
The origin of the survey can be traced back at least early as the Domesday Book in 1086, while some scholars pinpoint the origin of demography to 1663 with the publication of John Graunt's Natural and Political Observations upon the Bills of Mortality. Social research began most intentionally, however, with the positivist philosophy of science in the early 19th century.

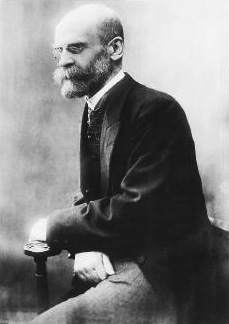
Émile Durkheim

Statistical sociological research, and indeed the formal academic discipline of sociology, began with the work of Émile Durkheim (1858–1917). While Durkheim rejected much of the detail of Auguste Comte's philosophy, he retained and refined its method, maintaining that the social sciences are a logical continuation of the natural ones into the realm of human activity, and insisting that they may retain the same objectivity, rationalism, and approach to causality. Durkheim set up the first European department of sociology at the University of Bordeaux in 1895, publishing his Rules of the Sociological Method (1895). In this text he argued: "[o]ur main goal is to extend scientific rationalism to human conduct. ... What has been called our positivism is but a consequence of this rationalism."

Durkheim's seminal monograph, Suicide (1897), a case study of suicide rates among Catholic and Protestant populations, distinguished sociological analysis from psychology or philosophy. By carefully examining suicide statistics in different police districts, he attempted to demonstrate that Catholic communities have a lower suicide rate than that of Protestants, something he attributed to social (as opposed to individual or psychological) causes. He developed the notion of objective suis generis "social facts" to delineate a unique empirical object for the science of sociology to study. Through such studies he posited that sociology would be able to determine whether any given society is "healthy" or "pathological", and seek social reform to negate organic breakdown or "social anomie". For Durkheim, sociology could be described as the "science of institutions, their genesis and their functioning".

=== Modern methodologies ===
In the early 20th century innovation in survey methodology were developed that are still dominant. In 1928, the psychologist Louis Leon Thurstone developed a method to select and score multiple items with which to measure complex ideas, such as attitudes towards religion. In 1932, the psychologist Rensis Likert developed the Likert scale where participants rate their agreement with statement using five options from totally disagree to totally agree. Likert like scales remain the most frequently used items in survey.

In the mid-20th century there was a general—but not universal—trend for American sociology to be more scientific in nature, due to the prominence at that time of action theory and other system-theoretical approaches. Robert K. Merton released his Social Theory and Social Structure (1949). By the turn of the 1960s, sociological research was increasingly employed as a tool by governments and businesses worldwide. Sociologists developed new types of quantitative and qualitative research methods. Paul Lazarsfeld founded Columbia University's Bureau of Applied Social Research, where he exerted a tremendous influence over the techniques and the organization of social research. His many contributions to sociological method have earned him the title of the "founder of modern empirical sociology". Lazarsfeld made great strides in statistical survey analysis, panel methods, latent structure analysis, and contextual analysis. Many of his ideas have been so influential as to now be considered self-evident.

== Social research organizations ==
Many social research organizations are operated on a national basis, for example:

- Center for the Advanced Study of Communities and Information, United States
- Centre of Research in Theories and Practices that Overcome Inequalities
- Economic and Social Research Council, United Kingdom (a Research Funding Council)
- National Centre of Research in Social and Cultural Anthropology, Algeria
- Institute for Social Research, Germany
- Mass Observation, United Kingdom
- Melbourne Institute of Applied Economic and Social Research, Australia
- Centre for Social Research and Methods, Australia
- National Centre for Social Research, United Kingdom
- National Opinion Research Center, United States
- New School for Social Research, New York City

== See also ==
- Analytic frame
- Behavioural science
- Causation (sociology)
- Cognitive science
- Criminology
- Engaged theory
- History of social science
- History of sociology
- History of political science
- Scale (social sciences)
- Social psychology
- Social Science Research Network
- Unobtrusive measures
