= Consecutive sampling =

In the design of experiments, consecutive sampling, also known as total enumerative sampling, is a sampling technique in which every subject meeting the criteria of inclusion is selected until the required sample size is achieved. Along with convenience sampling and snowball sampling, consecutive sampling is one of the most commonly used kinds of nonprobability sampling. Consecutive sampling is typically better than convenience sampling in controlling sampling bias. Care needs to be taken with consecutive sampling, however, in the case that the quantity of interest has temporal or seasonal trends. Bias can also occur in consecutive sampling when consecutive samples have some common similarity, such as consecutive houses on a street.
