= Mary Gibbons Natrella =

American statistician

Mary Gibbons Natrella (September 23, 1922 – May 18, 1988) was an American statistician and "an expert on the application of modern statistical techniques in physical science experimentation and engineering testing". She worked at the National Bureau of Standards, where she wrote their Handbook 91, Experimental Statistics (1963). It became one of their "all-time best selling publications" and has been recognized as "a monumental work" with "deep and long-lasting impact on the application of statistics to the planning and analysis of scientific experiments".

== Education and career ==
Mary Blanche Gibbons was born in Scranton, Pennsylvania. After earlier studies at Keystone College, she completed a bachelor's degree at the University of Pennsylvania in 1942. She worked as a mathematician for the U.S. Army Ordnance Department from 1942 to 1945, and as a statistician for the Navy beginning in 1945. In 1946, she married Joseph Victor Natrella, a mathematician for the Air Force who later worked for NASA. In 1950, she moved from the Navy to the National Bureau of Standards, where she remained until retiring in 1986.

== Contributions ==
Before writing her book, NBS Handbook 91 Experimental Statistics, Natrella helped produce defense standard MIL-STD-105 for acceptance sampling. At the National Bureau of Standards, she was responsible for teaching statistics to scientists, and "had a special gift for elucidating difficult statistical concepts".

== Recognition and legacy ==
In 1981, Natrella was elected as a Fellow of the American Statistical Association; her brother-in-law, Vito Natrella, was also a Fellow. She was also a fellow of the American Society for Test Materials. She was given the Department of Commerce Bronze Medal in 1982. She died in 1988 and was buried in Ivy Hill Cemetery in Alexandria, Virginia.

A scholarship in her and her husband's name is awarded annually by the American Statistical Association, funded by a gift from her husband when she died.
