= Harold F. Dodge =

American quality expert (1893–1976)

- Born: Harold French Dodge; January 23, 1893; Lowell, Massachusetts, U.S.
- Died: December 10, 1976 (aged 83); Mountain Lakes, New Jersey, U.S.
- Education: Massachusetts Institute of Technology (BS); Columbia University (MA)
- Occupations: Statistician; engineer; consultant; educator
- Spouse: Mildred Grace Lovelass (m. 1922)
- Children: 3
- Father: William Hanson Dodge
- Awards: Shewhart Medal

Harold French Dodge (January 23, 1893 – December 10, 1976) was one of the principal architects of the science of statistical quality control. He is known for his work in originating acceptance sampling plans for putting inspection operations on a scientific basis in terms of controllable risks.

== Early life ==
Harold French Dodge was born on January 23, 1893, in Lowell, Massachusetts. His father was the photographer William Hanson Dodge. Dodge graduated with a Bachelor of Science in electrical engineering from the Massachusetts Institute of Technology in 1916. He graduated with a Master of Arts in mathematics and physics from Columbia University in 1922.

== Career ==
Dodge worked as a quality result engineer at Bell Labs in New York City from 1917 to 1958. In the early 1930s, he worked with Harry Romig in developing the Dodge-Romig Sampling Inspection Tables. At Bell Labs, he also worked with Walter Shewhart, George Edwards, R. L. Jones, Paul Olmstead, E.G.D. Paterson, and Mary N. Torrey.

During his tenure with Bell Labs, he was involved in developing some of the basic concepts of acceptance sampling alongside his peers, including consumer's risk, producer's risk, double sampling, lot tolerance percent defective (LTPD) and average outgoing quality limit (AOQL). He also originated types of acceptance sampling schemes, CSP type continuous sampling plans, chain sampling plans and skip-lot sampling plans.

During World War II, Dodge had an office in the Pentagon and served as a consultant to the Secretary of War. He was a quality assurance consultant for NASA from 1961 to 1962 a consultant for Sandia Corporation from 1958 to 1967. He was chairman of the American Standards Association (later the American National Standards Institute) War Committee Z1, which prepared the Z1.1, Z1.2, and Zl.3 quality control standards. He developed Army Ordnance standard sampling tables and was an instructor at more than 30 Army Ordnance quality control training conferences. He chaired the American Society for Quality's Standards Committee and became the first chairman of the American Society for Testing and Materials (ASTM)'s committee on quality and standards (E11) in 1946.

From 1958 to 1970, he was professor of applied and mathematical statistics at the graduate college of Rutgers University's Statistics Center. He had patents on telephone instruments and electrical stethoscopes. He wrote articles on the analysis of heart and lung sounds and had dozens of articles on sampling inspection and quality control in technical publications.

Dodge was a member of the planning board in Mountain Lakes, New Jersey, for 17 years.

== Personal life ==
Dodge married Mildred Grace Lovelass, daughter of Cyrus W. Lovelass, on July 15, 1922. They had a son and two daughters, H. Stuart, Dorothy and Helen. Dodge died on December 10, 1976, at his home on Briarcliff Road in Mountain Lakes.

== Awards ==
Dodge was an honorary fellow of the Royal Statistical Society. He was a fellow of the Institute of Mathematical Statistics and the American Statistical Association. In 1950, ASTM gave Dodge the Award of Merit. In 1954, ASTM named him the Marburg Lecturer and in 1968, he became an honorary member of ASTM. He was a recipient of the Shewhart Medal in 1949 and the Grant Award in 1972. He was a fellow and founding member of ASQ and was made an honorary member in 1965.

In 1978, ASTM E11 committee named an award in his honor called the Harold F. Dodge Award for technical contributions.
