= Natrella =

Natrella is a surname. Notable people with the surname include:

- Mary Gibbons Natrella (1922–1988), American statistician
- Laurent Natrella, one of the Sociétaires of the Comédie-Française
- Vito Natrella, Fellow of the American Statistical Association, brother-in-law of Mary Gibbons Natrella
