= European Platform for Rehabilitation =

The European Platform for Rehabilitation (EPR) is a network of European providers of rehabilitation services to people with disabilities and other disadvantaged groups. EPR members deliver services in the fields of vocational training and education, reintegration of service users into the open labour market and improvement of their employability, physical rehabilitation and social care.

The Platform was first established in 1993 by rehabilitation centres in France, Germany, Italy and the Netherlands. Its secretariat is located in Brussels, Belgium.

== Main activities ==
The European Platform for Rehabilitation operates a range of services in the areas of professional development, research and innovation and public affairs. EPR is also active in the field of quality of services, and has developed its own quality system: EQUASS (European Quality Assurance for Social Services). EPR is a member of the Social Platform and has a seat at the EU's High Level Group on Disability as well as participatory status with the Council of Europe. EPR receives structural funding under the European Commission Lifelong Learning Programme 2007–2013, and is involved in a number of projects funded by the European Commission.

== Projects ==
The European Platform for Rehabilitation is currently involved in the "Assistive Technologies and Inclusive Solutions for All (ATIS4all)" project funded by EU's Policy Support Programme - Competitiveness and Innovation Framework Programme. ATIS4all project aims to improve the accessibility of assistive technology (AT) for all. Its main objective is to encourage an open discussion in order that a greater sharing of knowledge and expertise among key experts and users takes place. This is to be done while assuring the key principle that Human Rights are to be enjoyed equally by all people, including those with disabilities, the elderly and those from disadvantaged backgrounds. The project started in January 2011, and is expected to last for three years. EPR takes part in the project consortium, along with other major European organisations and stakeholders in the field of assistive technologies and integration. The ATIS4all open European collaborative web portal, collecting information about Assistive Technologies and inclusive solutions for all has been launched. ATIS4all network invites interested parties to visit and register to the portal and to join as “supporters” i.e. any organisation working in any field related to ICT-AT and inclusive solutions.

== Members ==
EPR's membership is separated into two types: Full and Associate. As of June 2013:

Full members:

- A2G, Norway
- Adelante, the Netherlands
- Centre de Réadaptation de Mulhouse (CRM), France
- Durapart, Norway
- Fundación ONCE, Spain
- Kompetanseutvikling Grenland (GREP), Norway
- Heliomare, the Netherlands
- Josefs-Gesellschaft (JG), Germany
- Luovi Vocational Institute, Finland
- National Learning Network, Ireland
- Pluryn, The Netherlands
- RehabCare, Ireland
- TBG Learning, United Kingdom

Associate members:

- APPACDM de Vila Nova de Gaia, Portugal
- Association of Vocational Rehabilitation Enterprises (AVRE), Norway
- Theotokos Foundation, Greece
- Astangu Rehabilitation Centre, Estonia
- Berufsbildungswerk Suedhessen, Germany
- Fagerh, France
- Fundação AFID Diferença, Portugal
- Fundación INTRAS, Spain
- National Organisations of Residential Homes and Special Schools (LOS), Denmark
- MEREK, Hungary
- GTB, Belgium
- Valakupiu Rehabilitation Centre, Lithuania
- University Rehabilitation Institute (URI), Republic of Slovenia
- Usel, Northern Ireland (UK)
- Panagia Eleousa, Greece
