= Quota sampling =

Survey sampling method

Quota sampling is a method for selecting survey participants that is a non-probabilistic version of stratified sampling.

== Process ==
In quota sampling, a population is first segmented into mutually exclusive sub-groups, just as in stratified sampling. Then judgment is used to select the subjects or units from each segment based on a specified proportion. For example, an interviewer may be told to sample 200 females and 300 males between the age of 45 and 60. This means that individuals can put a demand on who they want to sample (targeting).

This second step makes the technique non-probability sampling. In quota sampling, there is non-random sample selection and this can be unreliable. For example, interviewers might be tempted to interview those people in the street who look most helpful, or may choose to use accidental sampling to question those closest to them, to save time. The problem is these samples may be biased in a way that is difficult to quantify or adjust for. For example, if interviewers decide to question the first person they see, they may oversample tall respondents (who are more easily visible from a distance), which could lead to an overestimate of average income. This non-random element is a source of uncertainty about the nature of the actual sample.

== Uses ==
Quota sampling is useful when time is limited, a sampling frame is not available, the research budget is very tight or detailed accuracy is not important. Subsets are chosen and then either convenience or judgment sampling is used to choose people from each subset. The researcher decides how many of each category are selected.

== Connection to stratified sampling ==
Quota sampling is the non-probability version of stratified sampling. In stratified sampling, subsets of the population are created so that each subset has a common characteristic, such as gender. Random sampling chooses a number of subjects from each subset with, unlike a quota sample, each potential subject having a known probability of being selected.

== See also ==
- Coefficient of variation
- Standard deviation
