= Spatial distribution =

In statistics

A spatial distribution in statistics is the arrangement of a phenomenon across the Earth's surface and a graphical display of such an arrangement is an important tool in geographical and environmental statistics. A graphical display of a spatial distribution may summarize raw data directly or may reflect the outcome of a more sophisticated data analysis. Many different aspects of a phenomenon can be shown in a single graphical display by using a suitable choice of different colours to represent differences.

One example of such a display could be observations made to describe the geographic patterns of features, both physical and human across the earth.

The information included could be where units of something are, how many units of the thing there are per units of area, and how sparsely or densely packed they are from each other.

== Patterns of spatial distribution ==
Usually, for a phenomenon that changes in space, there is a pattern that determines the location of the subject of the phenomenon and its intensity or size, in X and Y coordinates. The scientific challenge is trying to identify the variables that affect this pattern. The issue can be demonstrated with several simple examples:

=== The spatial distribution of the human population ===
The spatial distribution of the population and development are closely related to each other, especially in the context of sustainability. The challenges related to the spatial spread of a population include: rapid urbanization and population concentration, rural population, urban management and poverty housing, displaced persons and refugees. Migration is a basic element in the spatial distribution of a population, and it may remain a key driver in the coming decades, especially as an element of urbanization in developing countries.

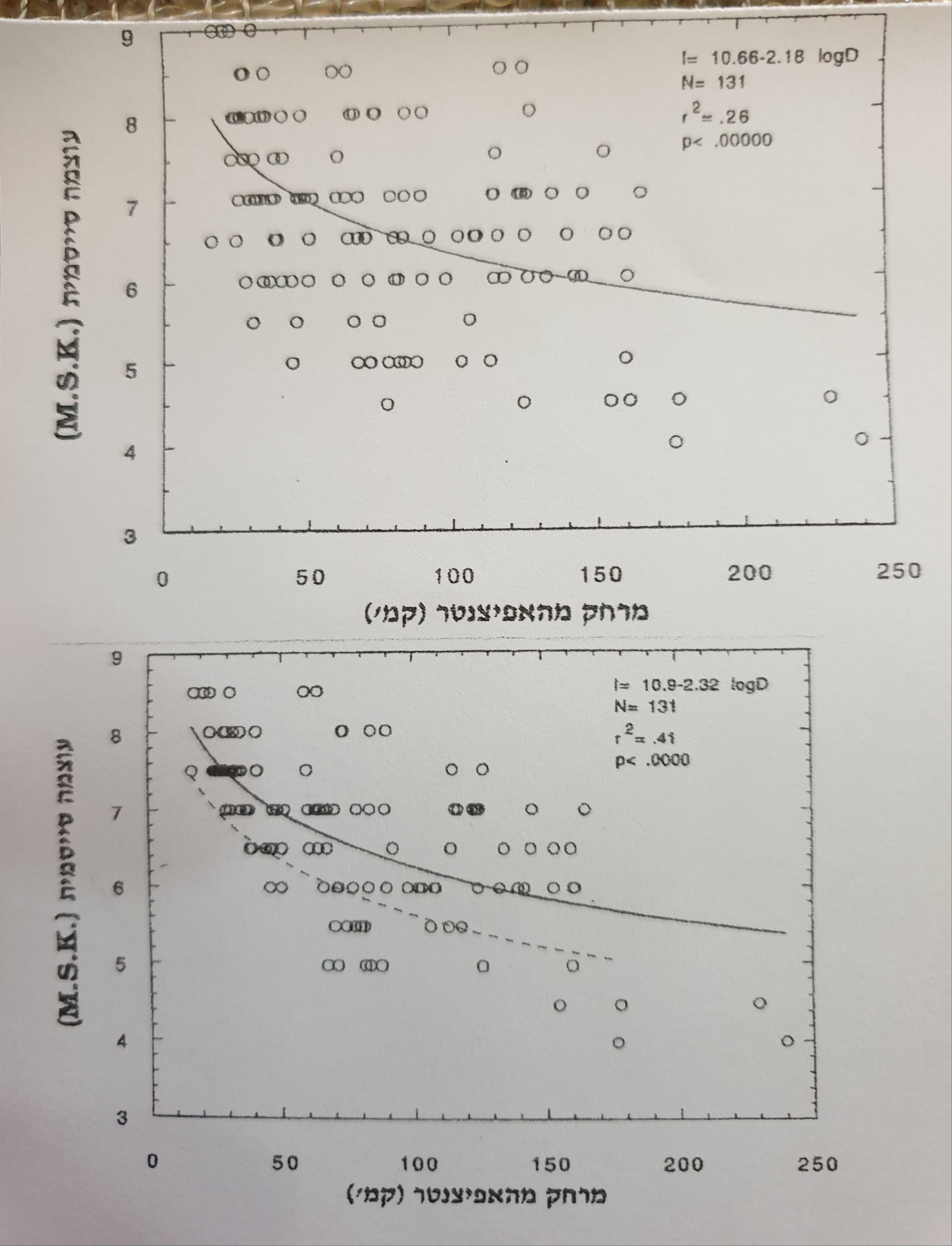
The curve above expresses the slope of the seismic intensity as a function of the distance from the epicenter, R^{2}=0.26 . When in a certain methodology the influence of the geological structure variable of each observation was neutralized, the R^{2} increases to 0.41, which means that the distance together with the geological structure already affect 41% of the variation in the spatial distribution of the intensities, and so on, one can continue and try to understand the effect of the other variables.

=== The spatial distribution of economic activity in the world ===
In a pair of studies from Brown University by urban economist J. Vernon Henderson, with co-authors Adam Storeygard and David Weil, the spatial distribution of the economic activity in the world was examined by mapping the artificial lights at night from space over 250,000 grid cells, the average area of each of which is 560 square kilometers. They found that 50% of the variation in this activity can be explained through a system of physical geographic features.

=== The spatial distribution of the seismic intensities of an earthquake ===
The seismic intensityies of an earthquake are distributed across space with an elementary regularity, so that in towns located close to the epicenter of the earthquake, high seismic intensities are observed and vice versa; Low intensities were observed in settlements far from the epicenter. The distance of each settlement from the epicenter is marked with XY coordinates, a variable that affects the seismic intensity observed there. But there are other variables that affect these intensities, such as the geological structure of each settlement, its topography, and more. All these make the simple regularity of the effect of the distance variable more complex. If we succeed in identifying the contribution of most of the variables to the fact that Intensity Z occurred in the XY settlement and not other one, we will understand the pattern that stands behind the organization of the seismic intensity in a specific earthquake, a fact that will help us in the field of seismic risks surveys and their assessments.

=== The spatial distribution of a population with health impairments related to vitamin A deficiency ===
Vitamin A deficiency is a major public health problem in poor societies. Dietary consumption of foods rich with vitamin A was low in Ethiopia. In 2021, a study was published that evaluated the spatial distribution and the spatial variables affecting it in dietary consumption of foods rich (or poor) in vitamin A among children aged 6–23 months in Ethiopia.

=== More examples ===
- Many police departments colour-code a city map based on crime statistics.
- The two-step floating catchment area (2SFCA) method has been used to prepare maps showing the relative accessibility of individuals (demand units) to physicians (supply units), by shading which shows many different degrees of accessibility.

== See also ==
- Spatial inequality
