= Long-Range Effects of Child and Adolescent Sexual Experiences =

1992 psychology book

- Cover of the 2014 Routledge edition
- Author: Allie C. Kirkpatrick
- Publisher: Routledge
- Publication date: 1992
- Pages: 224

Long-Range Effects of Child and Adolescent Sexual Experiences: Myths, Mores, and Menaces is a book by University of Georgia psychologist Allie C. Kirkpatrick. It was published by Routledge in 1992. The book studies an non-randomized sample of 500 women.
