= Mary N. Torrey =

Mathematical statistician

Mary Newton Torrey
- Born: February 2, 1910; Worcester, Massachusetts
- Died: July 1, 1998 (aged 88)
- Education: Wellesley College
- Alma mater: Columbia University
- Occupations: Mathematical statistician Quality control specialist
- Employer: Bell Laboratories

Mary Newton Torrey (February 2, 1910 – January 7, 1998) was an American mathematical statistician and quality control specialist for Bell Laboratories. With Harold F. Dodge at Bell Labs, she was an early contributor to the theory of acceptance sampling. The Dodge–Torrey continuous sampling plans are named after her and Dodge.

Torrey was born in Worcester, Massachusetts, and graduated in 1930 from Wellesley College as a Durant Scholar (Wellesley's highest honor) with a double major in mathematics and physics. In that year she joined the Quality Assurance Department of Bell Labs. While working there, she earned a master's degree in mathematical statistics from Columbia University in 1946.

In 1958, she was elected to be a Fellow of the American Statistical Association "for her contributions to the theory of sampling inspection, for her able analyses of engineering data, and for her clear and concise presentation of statistical quality control in electronics". She was also a fellow of the American Society for Quality Control.

Torrey died on January 7, 1998, at the age of 87.
