= Producer's risk =

Producer's risk is the probability that a good product will be rejected as a bad product by the consumer.

When the acceptance reliability level (ARL) is pi0, we can define the producer's risk as: P(Test is Failed|pi0)

It calculates the probability of loss from (1) rejecting a batch which, in fact, should have been accepted, or (2) accepting a batch that, in fact, will be rejected by the customer.

== See also ==
- consumer's risk
- Quality control
