= Cross-validation (analytical chemistry) =

In analytical chemistry, cross-validation is an approach by which the sets of scientific data generated using two or more methods are critically assessed. The cross-validation can be categorized as either method validation or analytical data validation.

== See also ==
- Validation (drug manufacture)
- Verification and validation
