= William Hanson Dodge =

American photographer

William Hanson Dodge (March 5, 1866 – February 1, 1932) was an American photographer in the late nineteenth and early twentieth centuries, living in Lowell, Massachusetts. His son, Harold F. Dodge, a noted mathematician, was a pioneer in the field of statistical quality control. William Dodge was employed by the Lowell Manufacturing Company; this firm was later purchased by the Bigelow Carpet Company. His work as a designer and color mixer was augmented by his hobby: photography. Dodge was a skilled photographer: in 1894 he won a bronze medal at a competition in New York City for a composition entitled “Winter.” This photo appears in W. I. Lincoln Adams's book Sunlight and Shadow, where it was included as an example of “successful landscape work”; other photographers whose work is featured in the book include Alfred Stieglitz and H. P. Robinson. Later that year, another of his photographs at an exhibition in New York, “December Morning,” was highly praised by a reviewer in American Amateur Photographer.

Another activity for Dodge was bicycle racing. Winning many ribbons as a racer, he belonged to the Spindle City Club, of Lowell, Massachusetts, taking many long trips with this group. He also served as a referee and official at races throughout the region during the 1890s. During these years, Dodge was also active in the Knights of Pythias, a men's fraternal organization, serving as chancellor and master of works.

In the early twentieth century, William Dodge turned to politics. He was elected to the Lowell Common Council in 1903. In 1905 he was elected president of the council, a year-long position, after which he served on the Board of Aldermen for a year.

Around 1910 William Dodge moved to Detroit, where he opened a business selling X-ray equipment to doctors and hospitals. His sales trips frequently took him to Chicago. He died at a hotel in Detroit on February 1, 1932.
