= Variables sampling plan =

Acceptance Sampling Technique

In statistics, a variables sampling plan is an acceptance sampling technique. Plans for variables are intended for quality characteristics that are measured on a continuous scale. This plan requires the knowledge of the statistical model (e.g. normal distribution). The historical evolution of this technique dates back to the seminal work of W. Allen Wallis (1943). The purpose of a variables plan is to assess whether the process is operating sufficiently far from the specification limit. Plans for variables may produce a similar OC curve to attribute plans with significantly less sample size.

The decision criterion of these plans are

$\bar{X}+ k\sigma \leqslant USL$ or $\bar{X}- k\sigma \geqslant LSL$

where $\bar{X}$ and $\sigma$ are the sample mean and the standard deviation respectively, $k$ is the critical distance, $USL$ and $LSL$ are the upper and lower regulatory limits. When the above expression is satisfied the proportion nonconforming is lower than expected and therefore the lot is accepted.

A variables sampling plan can be designed so that the OC curve passes through two points (AQL,$\alpha$) and (LQL,$\beta$). AQL and LQL are the Acceptable quality limit and the limiting quality level respectively. $\alpha$ and $\beta$ are the producer and consumer's risks. The required sample size ($n$) and the critical distance ($k$) can be obtained as

$$k = \frac{Z_{LQL}Z_{\alpha}+Z_{AQL}Z_{\beta}}{Z_{\alpha}+Z_{\beta}}$$

where $Z$ is the normal distribution function.

When the dispersion is known the required sample size ($n$) is obtained from

$$n = \left ( \frac{Z_\alpha +Z_\beta}{Z_{AQL}-Z_{LQL}}\right )^{2}$$

while for unknown $\sigma$ the sample size is approximately

$$n = \left ( \frac{Z_\alpha+Z_\beta}{Z_{AQL}-Z_{LQL}}\right )^{2}\left ( 1+\frac{k^2}{2} \right )$$

The MIL-STD-414 provides tables to obtain the required sample size and the critical distance according to the type of inspection.

== See also ==
- Acceptance sampling
