= Glenn Firebaugh =

American sociologist

Glenn Firebaugh is an American sociologist (born: Charleston, West Virginia) and leading international authority on social science research methods. Currently he is the Roy C. Buck Distinguished Professor of Sociology (Emeritus) at the Pennsylvania State University. He has also held regular or visiting faculty appointments at Harvard University, Vanderbilt University, Oxford University, and the University of Michigan. Firebaugh is best known for his contributions to statistical methods and for his research on global inequality. In 2018 he received the Paul F. Lazarsfeld Award from the American Sociological Association for "a career of distinguished contributions to the field of sociological methodology". His publications are highly cited by other social scientists.

== Career and education ==
Glenn Firebaugh attended graduate school at Indiana University at Bloomington where he received his M.A. in 1974 and Ph.D. in 1976, both in sociology with a minor in econometrics, and mathematical models. He then joined Vanderbilt University in 1976 as an assistant professor, and then advanced to associate professor in 1982. He joined Pennsylvania State as a Full Professor in 1988 and was the head of the Department of Sociology from 2001 to 2004. He advanced to Distinguished Professor in 2006.

From 1995 to 1996 Firebaugh was deputy editor and 1997 to 1999 he was the editor of the American Sociological Review.

== Major contributions ==
=== Rules for Social Research ===
Firebaugh summarizes the principles for good research in his book Seven Rules for Social Research. The first rule is that "There should be the possibility of surprise in social research." Good research also will "look for differences that make a difference" (Rule 2) and "build in reality checks" (Rule 3). Rule 4 advises researchers to replicate, that is, "to see if identical analyses yield similar results for different samples of people" (p. 90). The next two rules urge researchers to "compare like with like" (Rule 5) and to "study change" (Rule 6); these two rules are especially important when researchers want to estimate the effect of one variable on another. The final rule, "Let method be the servant, not the master," reminds researchers that methods are the means, not the end, of social research; it is critical from the outset to fit the research design to the research issue, rather than the other way around.

=== Firebaugh's general equation for inequality indices ===
Inequality indices are scalar measures designed to quantify the degree of inequality in distributions of some valued good, such as income. Researchers often use inequality indices to compare the degree of inequality across populations (for example, to determine if there is greater income inequality in California than in Texas, or in Brazil versus South Africa). The best-known inequality index is the Gini coefficient; others include the Atkinson measure, the Theil index, the Hoover index (a.k.a. Robin Hood index), and many others.

Firebaugh has shown that standard inequality indices reduce to a convenient common form. He begins by noting that perfect equality exists when the inequality ratio, r_{j} = X_{j} / $\scriptstyle\overline{X},$ equals 1.0 for all j units in some population (for example, there is perfect income inequality when everyone's income X_{j} equals the mean income $\scriptstyle\overline{X}$, so that r_{j} = 1.0 for everyone). Inequality, then, refers to deviations of the r_{j} from 1.0; the greater the average deviation, the greater the inequality. Inequality indices reflect that fact because they have this common form:

Inequality Index = $\Sigma_j p_j f(r_j),$

where p_{j} weights the units by their population share (necessary in a cross-country analysis, for example, since countries vary in population), and f(r_{j}) is a function of the deviation of each unit's r_{j} from 1.0, the point of equality. The important insight of Firebaugh's general inequality equation is that inequality indices differ because they employ different functions of the distance of the inequality ratios (the r_{j}) from 1.0.

=== Trends in global income inequality ===
Firebaugh was among the first to note that income inequality for the world as a whole leveled off in the last decades of the 20th century, after rising for more than two centuries. Firebaugh describes this important turning point in a 1999 lead article in the American Journal of Sociology and in a 2003 book. While global income inequality is massive, it has remained relatively steady or declined somewhat in recent years due to rapid income growth in China and India. Firebaugh's findings challenged earlier claims that global income inequality continues to rise rapidly. According to Firebaugh, that claim was based on a flaw: Each country was assigned equal weighting, despite vast differences in population size. When populous countries such as China and India are given their due weight, the data show that global income inequality has not been rising sharply, and most likely is not rising at all. Firebaugh's findings have been verified by others. As a result, earlier claims by the United Nations and the World Bank of rapidly rising global income inequality have been modified in their more recent publications.

=== Avoiding the ecological fallacy ===
Researchers are said to commit the ecological fallacy when they make untested inferences about individual-level relationships from aggregate data. It is called a fallacy because it is based on the problematic assumption that relationships at one level of aggregation also hold at another level of aggregation. To illustrate, consider the fact that George Wallace, a four-term governor of Alabama and well-known segregationist who ran as a third-party candidate well in the 1968 US presidential election, received a higher share of votes in regions with higher percentages of blacks. From this one might erroneously conclude that blacks were disproportionately inclined to vote for Wallace (post-election surveys showed that, while one in eight whites voted for Wallace, virtually no blacks did). Firebaugh has contributed to this literature by delineating theoretical conditions or rules under which it is possible to infer individual-level relationships from aggregate data. These conditions are important because researchers are subject to the ecological fallacy in virtually all the social and behavioral sciences - from history to political science to epidemiology – since individual-level data often are unavailable.

=== Decomposing social change ===
Decomposition in the social sciences is a methodological approach that breaks down aggregate social change into its underlying components. By partitioning a complex social outcome into contributing factors, researchers can better understand the sources of change, which is particularly useful for studying gradual, quantifiable transformations in public opinion, economic inequality, and demographic trends.

Glenn Firebaugh developed a decomposition framework that distinguishes between individual-level change—shifts in attitudes, behaviors, or attributes within a population—and population composition change (e.g., generational replacement). Unlike many prior decomposition approaches, which were primarily used in economic and demographic research, Firebaugh's method specifically adapted decomposition techniques to study social change using repeated cross-sectional studies.

His approach builds on Evelyn M. Kitagawa's (1955) Blinder–Oaxaca decomposition, which was originally developed for analyzing differences in rates between groups, and Norman B. Ryder's (1965) cohort effect theory, which emphasizes the role of demographic turnover in shaping long-term social trends. However, Firebaugh's decomposition method introduced new analytical features, including:

- Application to social change – Unlike earlier models, which were mainly applied to economic inequality or labor market differences, Firebaugh's approach was explicitly designed to study attitudinal and behavioral shifts in populations over time.
- Distinguishing individual change from demographic replacement – While previous decomposition techniques allowed for analyzing differences between groups, Firebaugh's method separates the effect of within-cohort change from cross-cohort replacement, providing a clearer distinction between individual ideological shifts and demographic turnover.
- Integration of algebraic and regression-based decomposition – Firebaugh refined prior methods by introducing both algebraic decomposition and regression-based decomposition techniques, allowing researchers to analyze change at different levels of aggregation and account for noise in trend data.

Additionally, Firebaugh offered refinements to earlier decomposition techniques by highlighting limitations in prior methods. He argued that some decomposition models assumed static cohort effects, failing to account for how cohort replacement interacts with individual change over time. His work also demonstrated that traditional decomposition methods could misattribute change when they did not explicitly distinguish between within-group shifts and population turnover.

Firebaugh's decomposition framework has been extensively utilized in sociological research to analyze various aspects of social change, including political realignment, public opinion trends, and social inequality. For instance, Firebaugh and Davis (1988) applied this method to assess regional and cohort effects on anti-black racism between 1972 and 1984. Additionally, Quillian (2012) employed a formal decomposition model to investigate how segregation and group poverty rates contribute to concentrated poverty, thereby shedding light on social inequality dynamics. Furthermore, Kanagy, Humphrey, and Firebaugh (1994) utilized Firebaugh's linear decomposition technique to examine growing environmental concern in the U.S., illustrating its application in public opinion research.

==== Firebaugh's Decomposition Model for Social Change ====
Firebaugh's method partitions total social change into two primary components:

1. Individual-level change (microchange effect) – changes occurring within cohorts over time.
2. Population composition change (turnover effect) – changes due to shifts in cohort composition (e.g., generational replacement).

Unlike panel data approaches, Firebaugh's decomposition method can be applied to repeated cross-sectional studies, allowing researchers to estimate the sources of social change even without tracking the same individuals over time.

Let μ represent the mean of a social indicator (e.g., the proportion of individuals supporting a policy) at two time points:

$\Delta \mu = \mu_2 - \mu_1$

where:

- μ_{1} is the mean at time 1.
- μ_{2} is the mean at time 2.

To decompose total change Δμ into its underlying components, Firebaugh formulated the following equation:

$\Delta \mu = \sum_j p_{j2} \mu_{j2} - \sum_j p_{j1} \mu_{j1}$

where:

- μ_{j} represents the mean for subgroup j (e.g., a birth cohort).
- p_{j} represents the population proportion of subgroup j at time 1 and time 2.

This equation can be rewritten to explicitly separate the contributions of individual change and population turnover:

$\Delta \mu = \sum_j p_{j1} \Delta \mu_j + \sum_j \mu_{j1} \Delta p_j$

where:

- The first term represents individual change within cohorts (microchange effect).
- The second term captures cohort replacement (turnover effect).

===== Applications of Firebaugh's Decomposition Model =====
Firebaugh applied his decomposition method to analyze changes in gender role attitudes in the United States using General Social Survey (GSS) data from 1972 to 1988. Over this period, public opinion shifted toward more egalitarian views on gender roles in politics, employment, and family life. Firebaugh's analysis demonstrated that both individual-level ideological change and cohort replacement contributed to these trends.

Key findings included:

- Cohort replacement played a consistent role in shifting attitudes, as younger, more egalitarian cohorts entered adulthood while older, more traditional cohorts exited.
- Individual change was more erratic, fluctuating across surveys but generally trending toward increased liberalism over time.

This study illustrated that societal shifts can occur even if individual attitudes remain stable, driven by demographic turnover. Firebaugh's decomposition framework has since been widely used in sociological research to distinguish between behavioral shifts and demographic effects in explaining social change.

In later work, he has also applied his decomposition approach to analyze trends in economic mobility and inequality, distinguishing between structural change in the labor market and individual-level economic advancement.

==== Regression-Based Approach to Decomposition ====
In addition to algebraic decomposition, Firebaugh introduced a regression-based decomposition method that models social change as a function of cohort and time effects. This approach estimates the contributions of individual-level change and cohort replacement through statistical modeling:

$Y_{it} = \beta_0 + \beta_1 Year_{it} + \beta_2 Cohort_{it} + \epsilon_{it}$

where:

- β_{1} captures within-cohort (individual-level) change
- β_{2} captures cross-cohort (replacement) change

Firebaugh's regression-based method offers a smoothed estimate of change by modeling cohort replacement and individual change as separate predictors in a statistical framework. This contrasts with algebraic decomposition, which directly calculates contributions to change based on group means. By incorporating year and cohort effects as independent variables, the regression approach enables researchers to estimate the distinct influence of generational replacement and attitudinal shifts while controlling for period-specific fluctuations.

==== Applications of Regression-Based Decomposition ====
Firebaugh has employed his own method to investigate whether shifts in party identification were primarily due to individuals switching political preferences or the entrance of younger voters with different political leanings.

Other researchers have applied the regression-based decomposition method has been utilized to explain inequalities in health outcomes across different groups. For example, Wan and Cheng (2004) have applied this approach to understand the extent to which differences in observable characteristics contribute to health disparities between populations.

==== Algebraic vs. Regression-Based Decomposition ====
Firebaugh himself noted that both methods are complementary rather than mutually exclusive. In his user's manual, Seven Rules for Social Research, he recommended using algebraic decomposition when researchers need precise cohort-level estimates and regression decomposition when short-term fluctuations or period effects might obscure long-term trends.

== Books ==
- Seven Rules for Social Research. Princeton: Princeton University Press. 2008. pp. 252 + index.
- The New Geography of Global Income Inequality. Cambridge and London: Harvard University Press. 2003. pp. 249 + index. 2 maps, 28 tables, 23 figures.
- Analyzing Repeated Surveys. Sage University Paper Series on Quantitative Applications in the Social Sciences, no. 07-115. Thousand Oaks, CA: Sage. 1997.

== Prizes and awards ==
- Taiwan National Science Council Distinguished Lecturer, Academia Sinica, Taipei, 2005
- Faculty Scholar Medal for Outstanding Achievement in the Social and Behavioral Sciences, Pennsylvania State University, 2001
- Best-Article Prize, Center for the Study of Inequality, Cornell University, 2001, for "Empirics of World Income Inequality" (American Journal of Sociology, May 1999)
- Lecturer, Zentrum fur Umfragen, Methoden und Analysen, Mannheim, Germany, 2000
- Distinction in the Social Sciences Award, College of the Liberal Arts, Pennsylvania State University, 2000
- Member, Sociological Research Association
- NIMH Fellow in Quantitative Methods, Indiana University, Bloomington, IN
