= MIL-STD-105 =

United States defense standard

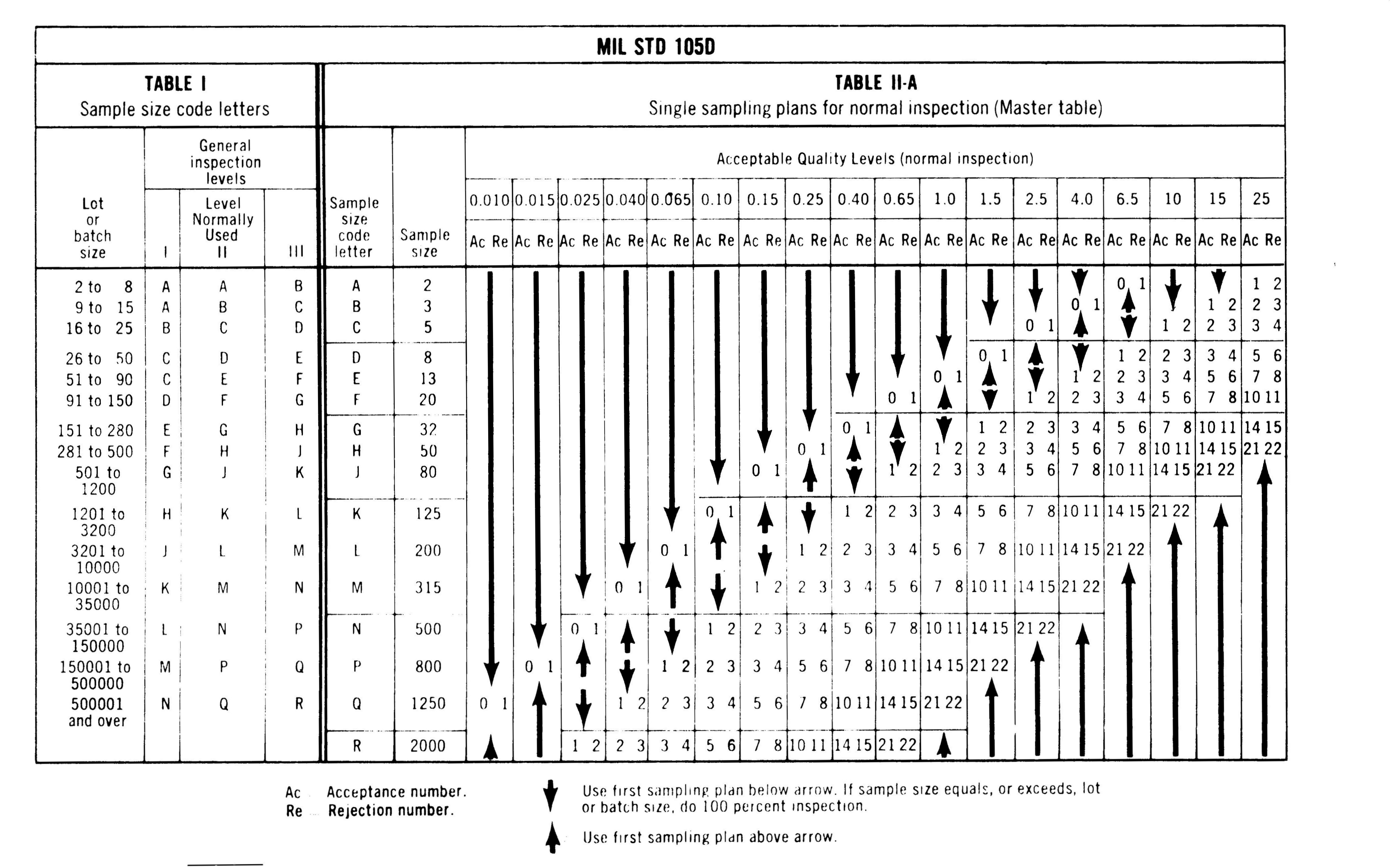
MIL-STD-105 D Quick reference Table, TABLE I and TABLE IIA

MIL-STD-105 was a United States defense standard that provided procedures and tables for sampling by attributes based on Walter A. Shewhart, Harry Romig, and Harold F. Dodge sampling inspection theories and mathematical formulas. Widely adopted outside of military procurement applications.

The last revision was MIL-STD-105E; it has been carried over in ASTM E2234.

It was officially cancelled in February 1995 by a Notice of Cancellation. This Notice was updated in March 2001 and again in February 2008. The current Notice of Cancellation (Notice 3) recommends that future acquisitions refer to: MIL-STD-1916, "DoD Preferred Methods for Acceptance of Product", or ANSI/ASQ Z1.4, "Sampling Procedures and Tables for Inspection by Attributes".

== Version ==
- Ver.D：Revision in 1963.
- Ver.E：Revision in 1989.

== See also ==
- Acceptable quality limit (AQL)
- Acceptance sampling
- Six sigma
