= Nonprobability sampling =

Sampling method

Nonprobability sampling is a form of sampling that does not utilise random sampling techniques where the probability of getting any particular sample may be calculated.

Nonprobability samples are not intended to be used to infer from the sample to the general population in statistical terms. In cases where external validity is not of critical importance to the study's goals or purpose, researchers might prefer to use nonprobability sampling. Researchers may seek to use iterative nonprobability sampling for theoretical purposes, where analytical generalization is considered over statistical generalization.

== Advantages and disadvantages ==
While probabilistic methods are suitable for large-scale studies concerned with representativeness, nonprobability approaches may be more suitable for in-depth qualitative research in which the focus is often to understand complex social phenomena. The in-depth analysis of a small purposive sample or case study enables the discovery and identification of patterns and causal mechanisms that do not draw time and context-free assumptions. Another advantage of nonprobability sampling is its lower cost compared to probability sampling.

Nonprobability sampling is often not appropriate in statistical quantitative research.

== Examples ==
Nonprobability sampling is widely used in qualitative research. Examples of nonprobability sampling include:

- Convenience sampling, where members of the population are chosen based on their relative ease of access. Such samples are biased because researchers may unconsciously approach some kinds of respondents and avoid others, and respondents who volunteer for a study may differ in important ways from others.
- Consecutive sampling, also known as total enumerative sampling, is a sampling technique in which every subject meeting the criteria of inclusion is selected until the required sample size is achieved.
- Snowball sampling, involving the first respondent referring an acquaintance, and so on. Such samples are biased because they give people with more social connections an unknown but higher chance of selection, but lead to higher response rates.
- Judgment sampling or purposive sampling, where the researcher chooses the sample based on who they think would be appropriate for the study. This is used primarily when there is a limited number of people that have expertise in the area being researched, or when the interest of the research is on a specific field or a small group. Types of purposive sampling include:
  - Deviant case: The researcher obtains cases that substantially differ from the dominant pattern. The case is selected in order to obtain information on unusual cases that can be specially problematic or specially good.
  - Case study: The research is limited to one group, often with a similar characteristic or of small size.
- Quota sampling. This is similar to stratified random sampling, in which the researcher identifies subsets of the population of interest and then sets a target number for each category in the sample. Next, the researcher samples from the population of interest nonrandomly until the quotas are filled.

Studies intended to use probability sampling sometimes unintentionally end up using nonprobability samples because of characteristics of the sampling method. The statistical model used can also render the data a nonprobability sample.

== See also ==
- Sampling (statistics)
- Cluster sampling
- Multistage sampling
- Simple random sample
- Systematic sampling
