= Positive recall =

Positive recall is a term used in quality systems, most notably ISO9000. It is part of receiving inspection procedures. It defines the concept that if a producer or manufacturer receives a product or process that requires inspection and it wishes to postpone the inspection process, it must have a system in place that will ensure that the postponed inspection process will take place at some point prior to final product/process acceptance. In ISO 9000 it is defined as clause 4.10.2.3, also known as Urgent production release.
