= Road safety audit =

A road safety audit (RSA) is defined as "the formal safety performance examination of an existing or future road or intersection by an independent, multidisciplinary team. It qualitatively estimates and reports on potential road safety issues and identifies opportunities for improvements in safety for all road users."

Road safety audits differ from conventional traffic safety studies in two key ways: road safety audits are often pro-active investigations, rather than reactive investigations of sites with histories of complaints or poor safety performance, and the investigation team is independent from the staff that is designing the project or maintains the road.

Road safety audits are commonly used in the United Kingdom and Australia, and are coming into wider use in the United States. They are a mandatory requirement for all trunk road Highway Improvement Schemes in the UK (including motorways). The requirements of a road safety audit are contained in the Design Manual for Roads and Bridges section GG 119 (formerly HD19/15).

A key feature of a road safety audit is the use of a team of professionals with varied expertise. The team should include highway safety engineers, highway design engineers, maintenance personnel, and law enforcement. Additional specialties should be added to the team as needed. The team members must not be involved in the design or maintenance of the facility being examined, so that they can have an objective point of view.

The road safety audit may investigate general safety conditions, or it may focus on specific concerns or users. Walkability audits concentrate on pedestrian safety and accommodation, and transit audits focus on safety of bus and train users. The New York State Department of Transportation's Safety Appurtenance Program (SAFETAP) uses audit techniques to make simple but effective safety improvements in conjunction with road resurfacing projects. This helps prevent increases in crashes that sometimes occur due to increased driving speeds after road resurfacing.

Audits attempt to avoid some of the limitations inherent to any crash history scoring system. Some of these limitations are:

- Reactive systems require waiting until crashes have already occurred, possibly with resulting injuries and fatalities.
- Crash frequencies are subject to regression toward the mean. It can be hard to determine whether good or poor short-term safety performance is due to the inherent safety or hazards of the site, or random variation. Sites with high or low crash rates are likely to move towards the mean as a matter of course, even if nothing changes.
- Most existing procedures focus on sites that have experienced the most accidents, which may or may not be the sites that could benefit most from a safety improvement.
- Reactive systems are limited by the quality and timeliness of the data entered into them. Deficiencies in crash reporting limit the effectiveness of these systems.

If historical crash data are available, the audit team should make use of them. However, one of the strengths of the audit process is it can find safety concerns before they contribute to crashes. Lack of data is a reason to use the audit process, rather than an excuse not to.

There are three basic forms of road safety audit:

- Audit of an existing road or road network

To check a road or a network for consistency, to make sure that a road user does not encounter unexpected road safety issues

- Audit of a roadworks project at various stages of completion:

Feasibility stage, or project scoping, when the general nature of the project is determined
Preliminary design stage, when alternate courses of action for the project are analyzed, and selected or discarded
Detailed design stage
Construction stage, to make sure work zone traffic controls are protecting road users and construction workers
Post construction stage, to make sure the completed project is performing as intended

- Thematic audit

Thematic audits focus on particular aspects of a road. They may be used to investigate road safety issues brought up by road user groups, or audits conducted to support a land development application.

Australian experience has shown benefit/cost ratios of from 3 to 242 from implementation of recommendations of individual design stages audits, and benefit/cost ratios of from 2.4 to 84 for existing road audits.

This makes sense as it assigns the highest benefit cost ratio to feasibility stage, preliminary design stage and design stage audits, since these audits can remove poor design features from projects before they are built.

== See also ==
- Road-traffic safety
- Verification and Validation
