= Expediting =

Concept in purchasing

Expediting is a concept in purchasing and project management for securing the quality and timely delivery of goods and components.

The procurement department or an external expeditor controls the progress of manufacturing at the supplier concerning quality, packing, conformity with standards and set timelines. Thus the expeditor makes sure that the required goods arrive at the appointed date in the agreed quality at the agreed location.

== Need ==
Expediting is especially needed in large scale projects, for example, in shipbuilding or when a refinery is being erected, because a delay caused by late delivery or inferior quality will increase expense and could lead to unsatisfied clients, thus the loss of a project or reputational damage. To save these unnecessary costs and minimize potential risks, the supplier and customer may agree on the use of a third party expeditor. These are experts from companies specializing in this field who keep track of the deadlines, supervise progress on site and check whether the components are properly packed. After inspection they notify the involved parties and banks about their findings; if everything is as agreed the bank will initiate the transfer of the price of the goods to the supplier. In this way, the supplier secures his liquidity as he is paid immediately when the components leave his factory (letter of credit) and the customer/bank knows that the goods will be delivered correctly. Expediting is relevant for many industries, such as the oil and gas industry, the general energy industry and the infrastructure industry.

Expediting exists in several levels:

- Production control: The expeditor inspects the factory whether the production is up to the standards of the country the goods are destined for. This is especially necessary for food or engineering equipment like power plant components. He or she controls as well whether the regular audits for ISO 9001 etc. have been made.
- Quality control: The components are tested whether they function as required and whether they are made to the measurements and standards of the customer. A part of this quality control can be the testing for compliance with standards of the destination country, e.g. ASME.
- Packing/transport survey: This is the lowest and most used level of expediting, as the goods are only counted and the packing is controlled whether it will withstand the adversities of transport (pre-shipment inspection).
- Project management: At a large-scale project, not only goods are controlled. The expeditor also keeps an eye on the deadlines and milestones of the project and whether the supplier will be on time. This way he or she monitors the crucial procurement parts of the project.

As the different levels of expediting require different skills, specialists and laboratories, many third party expeditors specialize in only one or several of these levels, while few offer expediting services on all levels.

Larger companies normally have their own expeditors who can perform all four levels. Third parties then are only used when in-house capacity is overstretched or a neutral third party is needed.

Most of the time companies use third party inspector expeditors who are responsible for inspection of critical items as well as expediting. In strict quality control conditions, those quality inspector expeditors will give importance to quality work, rather than to expediting work, which may not be a useful technique to get expediting work completed.

== Field expediting ==
Field expediting provides clients with a comprehensive review of the precise standing of their order and any on site action to rectify any potential problem areas. Field expediting means the inspection and control of the expeditor on site. This gives clients a comprehensive review of the exact current status of their order and an educated projection of the future planning and status. Furthermore, while being on site, experts for expediting can identify possible problems and bottlenecks that could lead to potential delays.

== Desk / Telephone Expediting ==
Desk expediting is also known as telephone expediting. It is an important tool for companies to monitor order progress with manufacturers. Contact is established at specific milestones within the order fabrication method and a brief outline of status standing obtained throughout the following conversation. This form of expediting can be helpful to check whether the project is still within the agreed schedule. An experienced expeditor will very quickly assess whether the order is progressing consistent with plan or whether alternative measures are needed to verify and presumably improve the order progress. Although it is a quick and easy way to be informed about the current status of a project, it should always be conducted in combination with field expediting to securely verify the actual status. Additionally, it is a helpful approach of making the vendor aware that delays on the order won't be accepted by their shopper.
