= European Quality in Social Services =

EQUASS
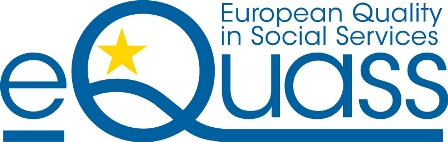
- Expansion: European Quality in Social Services
- Standards organization: European Platform for Rehabilitation
- Effective region: European Union and EFTA
- Effective since: 2003
- Predecessor: EQRM
- Product category: Social services of general interest
- Legal status: Advisory
- Website: www.equass.be

The European Quality in Social Services (EQUASS) is an integrated sector-specific quality certification system that certifies compliance of social services with European quality principles and criteria. EQUASS aims to enhance the social sector by engaging service providers in quality and continuous improvement and by guaranteeing service users quality of services throughout Europe.

EQUASS, formerly called the European Quality in Rehabilitation Mark (EQRM) is an initiative of the European Platform for Rehabilitation (EPR) and its secretariat is based in Brussels.

== History ==
In July 1995, the European Platform for Rehabilitation, then called the European Platform for Vocational Rehabilitation (EPVR), tasked its working group "Quality management and cost effectiveness" to study the launch of a "Quality Award for Vocational Rehabilitation" for European institutes of vocational rehabilitation. The award would require an audit which, if successful, would show that the institute of vocational rehabilitation works in accordance with the standards of the platform. The certification system to be launched was mainly inspired by the CARF certification. The European Platform for Rehabilitation enrolled a few of its members to implement the quality standard that was then named EQRM (European Quality in Rehabilitation Mark). The first awarding event took place in Rome in December 2003. The main values behind the quality mark were:

- A client-focused approach of rehabilitation services
- An awareness of the rights of service users
- The involvement and empowerment of service users
- A systematic enhancement of quality of life
- Motivation of staff
- Efficient business management practices
- Measuring and proving the service outcomes and results
- Services providers that are accountable for their actions and their use of funds

In 2008, the European Platform for Rehabilitation decided to create an additional quality assurance mark (EQUASS Assurance), alongside its EQRM mark (now renamed EQUASS Excellence). In December 2008 the European Platform for Rehabilitation launched a two-year project, partially funded by the Progress programme of the European Commission. The aim of the project was to develop, with the collaboration of the major European stakeholders in social services, a European Quality Framework for Social Services of General interest (SSGI). The Framework would include quality principles and criteria for quality assurance validated for the whole sector, and operational performance indicators for measuring and benchmarking performance on the quality criteria in social services. In 2010, the platform launched the results of the Common Quality Framework for SSGI, including the certification of a few pilot sites in charge of testing the new quality system in various types of social services. In January 2012, EQUASS deployed its new quality standard, now available for all social service providers in Europe, and no longer limited to rehabilitation providers and other disability services providers. The new quality standard was then based on the results of the Common Quality Framework for SSGI, but also other quality standards, listed below.

== Main EQUASS characteristics ==
=== Compliance with the European quality requirements ===
Social services providers that meet the certification requirements for European Quality in Social Services have demonstrated their compliance with the following requirements:

- The Voluntary European Quality Framework for Social Services which was adopted by the Social Protection Committee in October 2010.

- The Common Quality Framework for Social Services of General Interest (December 2010) in which 50 major stakeholders from various social services sectors agreed on the different components and pre-conditions of quality.

- Vocational Education and Training institutions that fulfil the criteria for EQUASS also comply with the European Quality Assurance Reference Framework for VET which was adopted by the European Parliament and the European Council on 18 June 2009.

- The UN Convention on the Rights of Persons with Disabilities (December 2006).

=== Principles of Quality ===
EQUASS is built on ten quality principles that reflect the wishes of its European stakeholders (funders, social partners, client representatives and advocacy groups), balancing business efficiency requirements, with a strong focus on protecting the rights of the clients, and a person-centred approach, while ensuring a professional development and training of the staff.

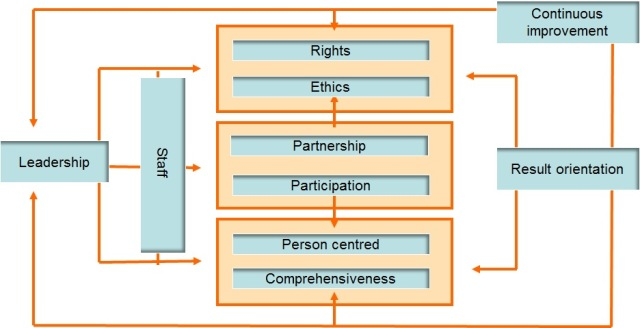
Presentation of EQUASS Principles of Quality

== EQUASS certification programmes ==
EQUASS certification offers a formal recognition of meeting the European quality requirements. EQUASS Assurance and EQUASS Excellence are based on the same Principles for Quality, with EQUASS Assurance being a stepping stone towards achieving the EQUASS Excellence level.

=== Quality Assurance in Social Services (EQUASS Assurance) ===
EQUASS Assurance guarantees quality of service provision by certifying compliance with 50 criteria based on the ten Principles for Quality. It can be viewed as a fundamental requirement for operating social services, having a feasible threshold in terms of costs, efforts and resources required. An organisation that meets the EQUASS Assurance criteria is certified for a two-year period.

=== Excellence in Social Services (EQUASS Excellence) ===
EQUASS Excellence is awarded to service providers that can demonstrate achievements and continuous improvement on all 50 criteria based on the ten Principles for Quality from three different perspectives: approach, deployment and results. An organisation that meets the EQUASS Excellence criteria is certified for a three-year period.

== EQUASS stakeholders and supervision ==
EQUASS is supervised and supported by a network of external and internal stakeholders. The EQUASS Awarding Committee comprises key European actors in social services and EU politics.

=== EQUASS Awarding Committee ===
All awarding processes are supervised by the European Awarding Committee.

== EQUASS certified organisations ==
As of July 2013, there are 440 certified organisations in 11 European countries, serving over 100.000 users, and employing over 14.000 staff members.

The areas in which the certified organisations are active include, among others:

- Social inclusion
- Professional rehabilitation, coaching and counseling
- Social enterprises, vocational training and adapted work for people with disabilities, or job placement into the open labour market
- Occupational therapy, respite care, community and social centres
- Physiotherapy
- Independent Living
- Early intervention and childcare
- Youth care
- Elderly care, and assisted living services
- Homelessness

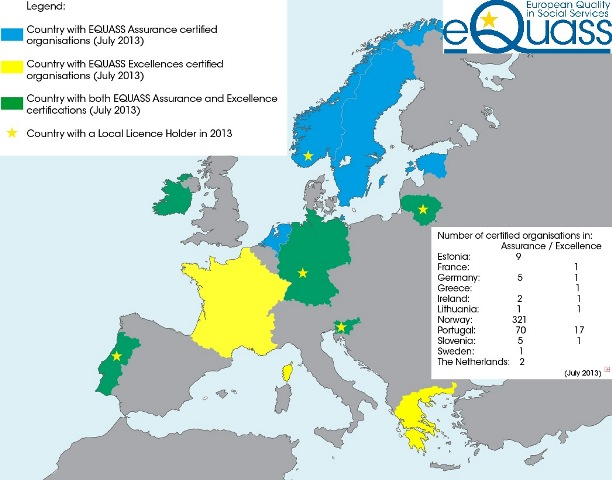
European map of organisations certified with EQUASS

In Norway, EQUASS Assurance certification is one of several quality labels that allow a disability service provider or social firm to get funding from the Norwegian Labour and Welfare Administration (NAV) in exchange for providing rehabilitation services. As a result of that endorsement, about 75% of the EQUASS Assurance certified organisations are located in Norway (as of 2013).

In Portugal and Estonia, the European Social Fund has supported the capacity building of its social services providers by funding EQUASS applications and supporting the costs of the implementation of a new quality system.

In Greece, a research paper published in 2013 in the Disability and Health Journal found that "[The] EQUASS initiative, developed according to European standards and implemented in resource-limited settings, was recognized as the most adaptive and appropriate system for Greek rehabilitation settings". The articles further claims that the "EQUASS initiative emerged as the most appropriate for implementation in the Greek health care setting, since it addresses a large number of existing problems, [...] and has already been partially applied in the Greek welfare sector."

== See also ==
- European social model
- Social protection
- Social welfare provision
- Institute for Continuous Improvement in Public Services
