= Snowball sampling =

Nonprobability statistical sampling technique

In sociology and statistics research, snowball sampling (or chain sampling, chain-referral sampling, referral sampling, qongqothwane sampling) is a nonprobability sampling technique where existing study subjects recruit future subjects from among their acquaintances. Thus the sample group is said to grow like a rolling snowball. As the sample builds up, enough data are gathered to be useful for research. This sampling technique is often used in hidden populations, such as drug users or sex workers, which are difficult for researchers to access. As sample members are not selected from a sampling frame, snowball samples are subject to numerous biases. For example, people who have many friends are more likely to be recruited into the sample. When virtual social networks are used, then this technique is called virtual snowball sampling.

It was widely believed that it was impossible to make unbiased estimates from snowball samples, but a variation of snowball sampling called respondent-driven sampling has been shown to allow researchers to make asymptotically unbiased estimates from snowball samples under certain conditions. Snowball sampling and respondent-driven sampling also allows researchers to make estimates about the social network connecting the hidden population.

== Description ==
Snowball sampling uses a small pool of initial informants to nominate, through their social networks, other participants who meet the eligibility criteria and could potentially contribute to a specific study. The term "snowball sampling" reflects an analogy to a snowball increasing in size as it rolls downhill.

=== Method ===
1. Draft a participation program (likely to be subject to change, but indicative).
2. Approach stakeholders and ask for contacts.
3. Gain contacts and ask them to participate.
4. Community issues groups may emerge that can be included in the participation program.
5. Continue the snowballing with contacts to gain more stakeholders if necessary.
6. Ensure a diversity of contacts by widening the profile of persons involved in the snowballing exercise.

== Applications ==
=== Requirement ===
The participants are likely to know others who share the characteristics that make them eligible for inclusion in the study.

=== Applicable situation ===
Snowball sampling is quite suitable to use when members of a population are hidden and difficult to locate (e.g. samples of the homeless or users of illegal drugs) and these members are closely connected (e.g. organized crime, sharing similar interests, involvement in the same groups that are relevant to the project at hand).

=== Application field ===
==== Social computing ====
Snowball sampling can be perceived as an evaluation sampling in the social computing field. For example, in the interview phase, snowball sampling can be used to reach hard-to-reach populations. Participants or informants with whom contact has already been made can use their social networks to refer the researcher to other people who could potentially participate in or contribute to the study.

==== Conflict environments ====
It has been observed that conducting research in conflict environments is challenging due to mistrust and suspicion. A conflict environment is one in which people or groups think that their needs and goal are contradictory to the goals and or needs of other people or groups. These conflicts among people or groups might include claims to territory, resources, trade, civil and religious rights that cause considerable misunderstanding and heighten disagreements, leading to an environment with lack of trust and suspicion. In a conflict environment, the entire population (rather than a specific group of people) is marginalized to some extent, which makes it hard for investigators to reach potential participants for their research. For example, a threatening political environment under an authoritarian regime creates obstacles for the investigators to conduct the research. Snowball sampling has been demonstrated as a useful method in conducting research in conflict environments, such as in the context of the Israel and Arab Conflict. Snowball sampling allows the investigators to approach the marginalized population at cognitive and emotional level and enroll them in study. Snowball sampling addresses the conditions of lack of trust that arises due to uncertainty about the future through trace-linking methodology.

==== Expert information collection ====
Snowball sampling can be used to identify experts in a certain field such as medicine, manufacturing processes, or customer relation methods, and gather professional and valuable knowledge.

For instance, 3M called in specialists from all fields that related to how a surgical drape could be applied to the body using snowball sampling. Every involved expert can suggest another expert who they may know could offer more information.

==== Public and population health research with marginalized and stigmatized populations ====
Snowball sampling can be used to recruit participants in research in marginalized, criminalized or other stigmatized behaviour, and its consequences. Examples include the use of illegal substances (e.g., unprescribed drugs), collection of illegal materials (e.g., ivory, unlicensed weapons), or stigmatized practices (e.g., support for anorexia, sexual fetish). Exclusion from majority society or fear of exposure or of shaming makes it difficult to contact participants through usual means. However, the nature of many of these behaviours means that people engaging in them have contact with each other. Snowball sampling is used in many studies of street-involved populations.

== Advantages and disadvantages ==
=== Advantages ===
1. Locate hidden populations: It is possible for the surveyors to include people in the survey that they would not have known but, through the use of social network.
2. Locating people of a specific population: There are no lists or other obvious sources for locating members of the population (e.g. the homeless, users of illegal drugs). The investigators use previous contact and communication with subjects then, the investigators are able to gain access and cooperation from new subjects. The key in gaining access and documenting the cooperation of subjects is trust. This is achieved that investigators act in good faith and establish good working relationship with the subjects.
3. Methodology: As subjects are used to locate the hidden population, the researcher invests less money and time in sampling. Snowball sampling method does not require complex planning and the staffing required is considerably smaller in comparison to other sampling methods.

Snowball sampling can be used in both alternative and complementary research methodologies. As an alternative methodology, when other research methods can not be employed, due to challenging circumstancing and when random sampling is not possible. As complementary methodology with other research methods to boost the quality and efficiency of research conduct and to minimize the sampling bias like quota sampling.

=== Disadvantages ===
1. Community bias: The first participants will have a strong impact on the sample. Snowball sampling is inexact and can produce varied and inaccurate results. The method is heavily reliant on the skill of the individual conducting the actual sampling, and that individual's ability to vertically network and find an appropriate sample. To be successful it requires previous contacts within the target areas, and the ability to keep the information flow going throughout the target group.
2. Non-random: Snowball sampling contravenes many of the assumptions supporting conventional notions of random selection and representativeness. However, social systems are beyond researchers' ability to recruit randomly. Snowball sampling is inevitable in social systems.
3. Unknown sampling population size: There is no way to know the total size of the overall population.
4. Anchoring: Another disadvantage of snowball sampling is the lack of definite knowledge as to whether or not the sample is an accurate reading of the target population. By targeting only a few select people, it is not always indicative of the actual trends within the result group. Identifying the appropriate person to conduct the sampling, as well as locating the correct targets is a time-consuming process such that the benefits only slightly outweigh the costs.
5. Lack of control over sampling method: As the subjects locate the hidden population, the research has very little control over the sampling method, which becomes mainly dependent on the original and subsequent subjects, who may add to the known sampling pool using a method outside of the researcher's control.

=== Compensations ===
The best defense against weaknesses is to begin with a set of initial informants that are as diverse as possible. Efforts to improve the main disadvantage of snowball sampling resulted in the respondent-driven sampling (RDS) method. RDS augments the referral method by weighting the sample in order to compensate for the initial non-random selection, which may lead to the reduction of errors occurring in sampling by the referral method.

== Virtual snowball sampling ==
Virtual snowball sampling is a variation of traditional snowball sampling and it relies on virtual networks of participants. It brings new advantages but also disadvantages for the researcher.

=== Advantages ===
- In hard-to-reach and hard-to-involve populations online sampling can better detect individuals of researcher's interest and allows to expand geographical scope of the studies
- Brings the possibility to increase representativeness of the results
- Virtual sampling can increase the number of responses in comparison with traditional snowball sampling. According to Baltar (2012) who used Facebook to search for participants for his study and conduct the research, it was possible to reduce the time necessary for building trust between the participant and researcher. Participants were more likely to share their personal information because the researcher was also sharing personal information on his/her Facebook profile. Increased level of confidence contributed to higher response rate
- Less costly relative to traditional snowball sampling technique

=== Disadvantages ===
- Even though the virtual sampling method can increase representativeness of the results, sample selection is biased towards the characteristics of online population such as gender, age, education level, socioeconomic level, etc.
- Target population might not always have access to the Internet

=== Example used in research ===
Virtual snowball sampling technique was used in order to find participants for the study of a minority group – Argentinian entrepreneurs living in Spain. About 60 percent of this population has double nationality – both Spanish and Argentinian. Spanish national statistics classifies them as European citizens only and there is no information about the place of birth tied to the profiles of entrepreneurs in Spain either. Therefore, referring to national statistics only, made it impossible to build a sample frame for this research. The use of virtual networks in this example of hard to reach population, increased the number of participating subjects and as a consequence, improved the representativeness of results of the study.

== Ethical issues ==
Ethical concerns may prevent the research staff from directly contacting many potential respondents. Therefore, program directors or personnel who knew of possible respondents can make initial contacts and then ask those who were willing to cooperate to personally contact the project. In each instance, the newly recruited research participant must be trained to understand and accept the eligibility criteria of the research. For example, in a study on treatment for substance-use disorder which used snowball sampling, it was difficult for many to understand the eligibility criteria because some criteria violated common-sense understandings concerning treatment and non-treatment. For example, many people define themselves as untreated in spite of possible long stays in civil commitment programs because their commitments to these institutions were involuntary and/or because they had become re-addicted upon release and then recovered at a later time. Therefore, the quality of informed consent was in doubt.

In a qualitative research, apprehension around feelings of compulsion are reviewed for potential ethical dilemmas and recommendations for research process are made.

== Improvements ==
Snowball sampling is a recruitment method that employs research into participants' social networks to access specific populations. According to research mentioned in the paper written by Kath Browne, using social networks to research is accessible. In this research, Kath Browne used social networks to research non-heterosexual women. Snowball sampling is often used because the population under investigation is hard to approachable either due to low numbers of potential participants or the sensitivity of the topic. The author indicated the recruitment technique of snowball sampling, which uses interpersonal relations and connections within people. Due to the use of social networks and interpersonal relations, snowball sampling forms how individuals act and interact in focus groups, couple interviews and interviews. As a result, snowball sampling not only results in the recruitment of particular samples, use of this technique produces participants'accounts of their lives. To help mitigate these risks, it is important to not rely on any one single method of sampling to gather data about a target sector. In order to most accurately obtain information, a company must do everything it possibly can to ensure that the sampling is controlled. Also, it is imperative that the correct personnel is used to execute the actual sampling, because one missed opportunity could skew the results.

=== Respondent-driven sampling ===
A new approach to the study of hidden populations. It is effectively used to avoid bias in snowball sampling. Respondent-driven sampling involves both a field sampling technique and custom estimation procedures that correct for the presence of homophily on attributes in the population. The respondent-driven sampling method employs a dual system of structured incentives to overcome some of the deficiencies of such samples. Like other chain-referral methods, RDS assumes that those best able to access members of hidden populations are their own peers.

=== Peer Esteem Snowballing (PEST) ===
Peer Esteem Snowballing is a variation of snowball sampling, useful for investigating small populations of expert opinion. Its proponents argue that it has a number of advantages relative to other snowballing techniques:

1. reduces the selection bias inherent in initial seed samples for a snowball by advocating for a nominations phase that objectively identifies contact seeds for the first wave;
2. by analysing network data it provides an estimate of the population size, unbiased by any researcher defined population boundary;
3. by reporting the estimate of the sample size vis a vis the population, it provides a measure of relative significance (optimal sampling data can be reported in this context);
4. through a network analysis of referrals it allows for identifying clusters of experts that may be instrumental in explain variations in their response profile;
5. allows for a referrals nominations strategy that, in certain cases, could improve response rates, while the nominations strategy acts as an ultimate validation of expertise for informants and therefore improves content validity.
