= Quality management system =

Sum of product fitness processes in a business

A quality management system (QMS) is a collection of business processes focused on consistently meeting customer requirements and enhancing their satisfaction. It is aligned with an organization's purpose and strategic direction, and is expressed as organizational goals and aspirations, policies, processes, documented information, and resources needed to implement and maintain them. Early quality management systems emphasized predictable outcomes of the production line using simple statistics and random sampling. By the 20th century, since labor inputs were typically the most costly inputs in most industrialized societies, focus shifted to team cooperation and dynamics, especially the early signaling of problems via continual improvement cycles. In the 21st century, QMS has tended to converge with sustainability and transparency initiatives, as both investor and customer satisfaction and perceived quality are increasingly tied to these factors. The ISO 9000 family of standards is probably the most widely implemented QMS regimes; the ISO 19011 audit regime also applies to both and deals with quality and sustainability and their integration.

Other QMS, e.g. the Natural Step framework, focus on sustainability issues and assume that other quality problems will be reduced as result of the systematic thinking, transparency, documentation and diagnostic discipline.

The term "Quality Management System" and the initialism "QMS" were invented in 1991 by Ken Croucher, a British management consultant working on designing and implementing a generic model of a QMS within the IT industry.

== History ==
The concept of quality as used in QMS first emerged from the Industrial Revolution. Previously, goods had been made from start to finish by the same person or team of people, with handcrafting and tweaking the product to meet 'quality criteria'. Mass production brought huge teams of people together to work on specific stages of production where one person would not necessarily complete a product from start to finish. In the late 19th century pioneers such as Frederick Winslow Taylor and Henry Ford recognized the limitations of the methods being used in mass production at the time and the subsequent varying quality of output. Birland established Quality Departments to oversee the quality of production and rectifying of errors, and Ford emphasized standardization of design and component standards to ensure a standard product was produced. Management of quality was the responsibility of the Quality Department and was implemented by Inspection of product output to 'catch' defects.

Application of statistical control came later as a result of World War production methods, advanced by W. Edwards Deming, a statistician, after whom the Deming Prize for quality is named. Joseph M. Juran, another worker in the field, focused on management, publishing a Quality Control Handbook in 1951. He also developed "Juran's trilogy", an approach to cross-functional management composed of three managerial processes: quality planning, quality control, and quality improvement.

The quality profession grew from simple control to engineering, to systems engineering. Quality control activities were predominant in the 1940s, 1950s, and 1960s. The 1970s were an era of quality engineering and the 1990s saw quality systems as an emerging field. Like medicine, accounting, and engineering, quality has achieved status as a recognized profession.

There are many organizations that are striving to assess the methods and ways in which their overall productivity, the quality of their products and services and the required operations to achieve them are done.

== Contents and standards ==
Elements of QMS include quality objectives, a quality manual, organizational structure and responsibilities, data management, processes (including purchasing), product quality leading to customer satisfaction, continuous improvement including corrective and preventive action, quality instruments, document control, employee training and engagement, and supplier quality management.

The International Organization for Standardization's ISO 9001:2015 series describes standards for a QMS addressing the principles and processes surrounding the design, development, and delivery of a general product or service. Organizations can participate in a continuing certification process to ISO 9001:2015 to demonstrate their compliance with the standard, which includes a requirement for continual (i.e. planned) improvement of the QMS, as well as more foundational QMS components such as failure mode and effects analysis (FMEA).

The European Quality in Social Service (EQUASS) is a sector-specific quality system designed for the social services sector and addresses quality principles that are specific to service delivery to vulnerable groups, such as empowerment, rights, and person-centredness.

The Alliance for Performance Excellence is a network of state and local organizations that use the Baldrige Criteria for Performance Excellence at the grassroots level to improve the performance of local organizations and economies. browsers can find Alliance members in their state and get the latest news and events from the Baldrige community.

ISO 9000:2005 provides information on the fundamentals and vocabulary used in quality management systems. ISO 9004:2009 provides guidance on a quality management approach for the sustained success of an organization. Neither of these standards can be used for certification purposes as they provide guidance, not requirements.

=== Medical devices ===
Quality system requirements for medical devices have been recognized as a way to assure product safety and efficacy and customer satisfaction since at least 1983 and were instituted as requirements in a final rule published on October 7, 1996. The rule is promulgated at 21 CFR 820.

The two current primary guidelines for medical device manufacturer QMS and related services are the ISO 13485 standards and the US FDA 21 CFR 820 regulations. The two are very similar, and many manufacturers adopt a QMS that is compliant with both guidelines. In the European Union, EN ISO 13485:2016 and its amendment A11:2021 are cited as harmonised standards under both the Medical Device Regulation (Regulation (EU) 2017/745) and the In Vitro Diagnostic Medical Devices Regulation (Regulation (EU) 2017/746). The ISO standard is also incorporated in regulations for other jurisdictions, such as Japan (JPAL) and Canada (CMDCAS).

According to current good manufacturing practice (GMP), medical device manufacturers have the responsibility to use good judgment when developing their quality system and apply those sections of the FDA Quality System (QS) regulation that are applicable to their specific products and operations, in Part 820 of the QS regulation. As with GMP operating within this flexibility, it is the responsibility of each manufacturer to establish requirements for each type or family of devices that will result in devices that are safe and effective, and to establish methods and procedures to design, produce, and distribute devices that meet the quality system requirements.

The FDA has identified in the QS regulation the 7 essential subsystems of a quality system. These subsystems include:

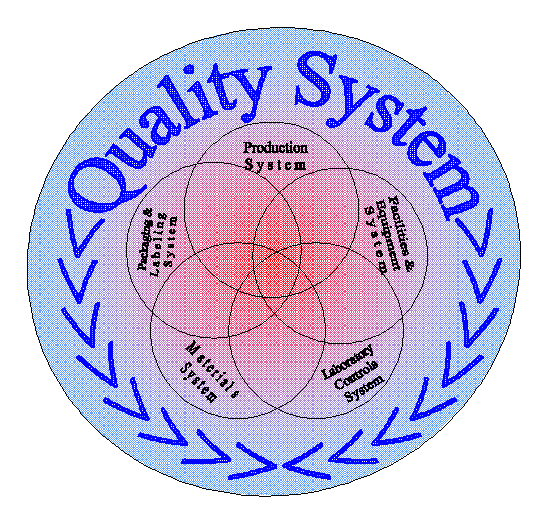
Venn diagram describing a quality system as an intersection of five subsystems

- Management controls
- Design controls
- Production and process controls
- Corrective and preventative actions
- Material controls
- Records, documents, and change controls
- Facilities and equipment controls

All of these are overseen by management and quality audits.

Because the QS regulation covers a broad spectrum of devices and production processes, it allows some leeway in the details of quality system elements. It is left to manufacturers to determine the necessity for, or extent of, some quality elements and to develop and implement procedures tailored to their particular processes and devices. For example, if it is impossible to mix up labels at a manufacturer because there is only one label to each product, then there is no necessity for the manufacturer to comply with all of the GMP requirements under device labeling.

Drug manufacturers are regulated under a different section of the Code of Federal Regulations.

== Awards ==
The Baldrige Performance Excellence Program educates organizations in improving their performance and administers the Malcolm Baldrige National Quality Award. The Baldrige Award recognizes U.S. organizations for performance excellence based on the Baldrige Criteria for Performance Excellence. The Criteria address critical aspects of management that contribute to performance excellence: leadership; strategy; customers; measurement, analysis, and knowledge management; workforce; operations; and results.

The European Foundation for Quality Management's EFQM Excellence Model supports an award scheme similar to the Baldrige Award for European companies.

In Canada, the National Quality Institute presents the 'Canada Awards for Excellence' on an annual basis to organizations that have displayed outstanding performance in the areas of Quality and workplace wellness, and have met the institute's criteria with documented overall achievements and results.

== Process ==
A QMS process is an element of an organizational QMS. The ISO 9001 standard requires organizations seeking compliance or certification to define the processes which form the QMS and the sequence and interaction of these processes. Butterworth-Heinemann and other publishers have offered several books which provide step-by-step guides to those seeking the quality certifications of their products.

Examples of such processes include:

- complying with specific requirements (e.g., statistical process control and measurement systems analysis)
- calibrations
- corrective and preventive action
- internal audit
- order processes
- product/service/process measurements
- identification, labeling, and control of non-conforming products to prevent its inadvertent use, delivery, or processing
- production plans
- purchasing and related processes, such as supplier selection and monitoring

ISO 9001 requires that the performance of these processes be measured, analyzed and continually improved, and the results of this form an input into the management review process.

== Software ==
Quality management software offers the techniques, processes, structure, and resources needed to simplify manufacturing and ERP activities while handling quality concerns efficiently and cost-effectively. This software helps manufacturers to monitor, control, and document quality processes electronically to guarantee that goods are made within tolerance, meet all necessary requirements, and are defect-free. Quality management software is often used in the manufacturing industry to identify potential issues before they occur.

Some benefits of quality management software include real-time data monitoring, issue prevention, risk management, increased efficiency and productivity, process consistency, and increased employee participation.

Quality management software can be integrated with manufacturing execution systems (MES). A MES is a complete, dynamic software system for monitoring, tracking, documenting, and controlling the manufacturing process from raw materials to final products. When combined with QMS, these systems ensure compliance, enable quality programs, eliminate waste, reduce product recalls, lower per-product cost, increase product quality, provide product tracking, increase quality control with real-time information, facilitate realistic production schedules, and maintain an up-to-date inventory.

Quality management software focuses on 4 main elements:

1. Document management: Quality management software enables companies to manage all product and quality records and documents, including product specifications, work instructions, standard operating procedures (SOPs), quality policies, and training records, among other things, to fulfill highly regulated requirements. Quality management software centralizes the storage of these documents.
2. Regulatory compliance: To decrease compliance risks, quality management software is used within companies to make sure they comply with ISO, OSHA, FDA, and other industry norms and requirements. The software makes closed-loop corrective and preventive action procedures (CAPA) possible, which result in faster issue resolution and issue prevention.
3. Feedback loops: Quality management software permits staff to submit feedback or recommendations through centralized software. In turn, this way, managers gather insights from the shop floor, creating a feedback loop.
4. Training and skill management: To maintain product quality, quality management software can provide a fixed system through which employees and staff can be trained. This fixed system provides more clarity in the different tracking processes of the company and simplifies the tracking of different skill levels of employees.

Most quality management software is designed as software as a service.

== See also ==
- Capability Maturity Model Integration
- Cleaner production
- Good manufacturing practice
- ISO 14001
- List of management topics
- List of national quality awards
- Manufacturing process management
- Positive recall
- Process architecture
- Quality assurance
- Quality control
- Software quality
- Standard operating procedure
- Technical documentation
- Total quality management
- Verification and validation
