= Acceptance sampling =

Common quality control technique

Acceptance sampling uses statistical sampling to determine whether to accept or reject a production lot of material. It has been a common quality control technique used in industry.

It is usually done as products leave the factory, or in some cases even within the factory. Most often a producer supplies a consumer with several items and a decision to accept or reject the items is made by determining the number of defective items in a sample from the lot. The lot is accepted if the number of defects falls below where the acceptance number or otherwise the lot is rejected.

In general, acceptance sampling is employed when one or several of the following hold:

- testing is destructive;
- the cost of 100% inspection is very high; and
- 100% inspection takes too long.

A wide variety of acceptance sampling plans is available. For example, multiple sampling plans use more than two samples to reach a conclusion. A shorter examination period and smaller sample sizes are features of this type of plan. Although the samples are taken at random, the sampling procedure is still reliable.

== History ==
Acceptance sampling procedures became common during World War II. Sampling plans, such as MIL-STD-105, were developed by Harold F. Dodge and others and became frequently used as standards.

More recently, quality assurance broadened the scope beyond final inspection to include all aspects of manufacturing. Broader quality management systems include methodologies such as statistical process control, HACCP, six sigma, and ISO 9000. Some use of acceptance sampling still remains.

== Rationale ==
Sampling provides one rational means of verification that a production lot conforms to the requirements of technical specifications. 100% inspection does not guarantee 100% compliance and is too time-consuming and costly. Rather than evaluating all items, a specified sample is taken, inspected or tested, and a decision is made about accepting or rejecting the entire production lot.

Sampling plans have known risks: an acceptable quality limit (AQL) and a rejectable quality level, such as lot tolerance percent defective (LTDP), are part of the operating characteristic curve of the sampling plan. These are primarily statistical risks and do not necessarily imply that a defective product is intentionally being made or accepted. Plans can have a known average outgoing quality limit (AOQL).

== Acceptance sampling for attributes ==
A single sampling plan for attributes is a statistical method by which the lot is accepted or rejected on the basis of one sample. Suppose that we have a lot of sizes $M$; a random sample of size $N<M$ is selected from the lot; and an acceptance number $B$ is determined. If it is found the number of nonconforming is less than or equal to $B$, the lot is accepted; and if the number of nonconforming is greater than $B$, the lot is not accepted. The design of a single sampling plan requires the selection of the sample size $N$ and the acceptance number $B$.

MIL-STD-105 was a United States defense standard that provided procedures and tables for sampling by attributes (pass or fail characteristic). MIL-STD-105E was cancelled in 1995 but is available in related documents such as ANSI/ASQ Z1.4, "Sampling Procedures and Tables for Inspection by Attributes." Several levels of inspection are provided and can be indexed to several AQLs. The sample size is specified and the basis for acceptance or rejection (number of defects) is provided. MIL-STD-1916 is currently the preferred method of sampling for all Department of Defense (DoD) contracts.

== Variables sampling plan ==
When a measured characteristic produces a number, other sampling plans, such as those based on MIL-STD-414, are often used. Compared with attribute sampling plans, these often use a smaller sample size for the same indexed AQL.

== See also ==
- Acceptability
- Acceptance testing
- Variables sampling
