= Consumer's risk =

Risk that a product not up to standard will pass through quality checks

Consumer's risk or Consumer risk is a potential risk found in all consumer-oriented products, that a product not meeting quality standards will pass undetected through the manufacturer's quality control system and enter the consumer marketplace.

== See also ==
- Commercial law
- Consumer protection laws
- Products liability
- Uniform Commercial Code
- Warranty
- Statistics
