= Acceptable quality limit =

Aspect of process control

The acceptable quality limit (AQL) is the worst tolerable process average (mean) in percentage or ratio that is still considered acceptable; that is, it is at an acceptable quality level. Closely related terms are the rejectable quality limit and rejectable quality level (RQL). In a quality control procedure, a process is said to be at an acceptable quality level if the appropriate statistic used to construct a control chart does not fall outside the bounds of the acceptable quality limits. Otherwise, the process is said to be at a rejectable control level.

In 2008 the usage of the abbreviation AQL for the term "acceptable quality limit" was changed in the standards issued by at least one national standards organization (ANSI/ASQ) to relate to the term "acceptance quality level". It is unclear whether this interpretation will be brought into general usage, but the underlying meaning remains the same.

An acceptable quality level is a test and/or inspection standard that prescribes the range of the number of defective components that is considered acceptable when random sampling those components during an inspection. The defects found during an electronic or electrical test, or during a physical (mechanical) inspection, are sometimes classified into three levels: critical, major and minor. Critical defects are those that render the product unsafe or hazardous for the end user or that contravene mandatory regulations. Major defects can result in the product's failure, reducing its marketability, usability or saleability. Lastly, minor defects do not affect the product's marketability or usability, but represent workmanship defects that make the product fall short of defined quality standards. Different companies maintain different interpretations of each defect type. In order to avoid argument, buyers and sellers agree on an AQL standard, chosen according to the level of risk each party assumes, which they use as a reference during pre-shipment inspection.

== See also ==
- Acceptability
- Acceptance sampling
- Statistical process control
- Control limits
