= Judgment sample =

A judgment sample, also known as an expert or purposive sample, is a type of non-random sample, where a researcher or expert selects the sample based on who they believe would be most useful or appropriate for the study.

Results obtained from a judgment sample are subject to some degree of bias and may be hard to generalize, due to the chosen sample not representing the larger population.

A random sample would provide less bias, but potentially less raw information. The pitfalls of this system are significant because of bias, limited statistical methods, and limits to an expert's ability to choose a good sample.
