= Convenience sampling =

Sampling from the part of the population close at hand

Convenience sampling (also known as grab sampling, accidental sampling, or opportunity sampling) is a type of non-probability sampling that involves the sample being drawn from that part of the population that is close at hand.

Convenience sampling is not often recommended by official statistical agencies for research due to the possibility of sampling error and lack of representation of the population. It can be useful in some situations, for example, where convenience sampling is the only possible option. A trade-off exists between this method's speed and accuracy. Collected samples may not accurately represent the population of interest and can be a source of bias; however, larger sample sizes reduce the likelihood of sampling error occurring.

== Advantages ==
Convenience sampling is used is due to its speed, ease of use, and availability.

=== Expedited data collection ===
When time is of the essence, many researchers turn to convenience sampling for data collection, as they can swiftly gather data and begin their calculations. It is useful in time-sensitive research because very little preparation is needed to use convenience sampling for data collection. It is also useful when researchers need to conduct pilot data collection in order to gain a quick understanding of certain trends or to develop hypotheses for future research. By rapidly gathering information, researchers and scientists can identify emerging trends or extrapolate generalized insights from local public opinion.

=== Ease of research ===
Researchers who are not seeking accurate sampling can simply collect their information and proceed to other aspects of their study. This type of sampling can be done by simply creating a questionnaire and distributing it to their targeted group. Through this method, researchers can easily finish collecting their data in a matter of hours, free from worrying about whether it is an accurate representation of the population. This allows for a great ease of research, letting researchers focus on analyzing the data rather than interviewing and carefully selecting participants.

=== Ready availability ===
Since most convenience sampling is collected with the populations on hand, the data are readily available for the researcher to collect. They do not typically have to travel great distances to collect the data, but simply pull from whatever environment is nearby. Having a sample group readily available is important for meeting quotas quickly and allows the researcher to conduct multiple studies in an expeditious manner.

=== Cost effectiveness ===
One of the most important aspects of convenience sampling is its cost-effectiveness. This method enables funds to be allocated to other aspects of the project. Often, this method of sampling is used to secure funding for a larger, more comprehensive research project. In this instance, funds are not yet available for a comprehensive survey, so a quick selection of the population will be used to demonstrate the need for the completed project.

== Disadvantages ==
Although convenience sampling can be easily obtained, its disadvantages can outweigh this advantage. This sampling technique may be more suitable for one type of study than for another.

=== Bias ===
The results of the convenience sampling cannot be generalized to the target population because of the potential bias of the sampling technique due to the under-representation of subgroups in the sample in comparison to the population of interest. The bias of the sample cannot be measured. Therefore, inferences based on convenience sampling should be made only about the sample itself.

=== Power ===
Convenience sampling is characterized by insufficient power to identify differences between population subgroups.

=== Measurement of the sampling error ===
Convenience sampling does not allow for the computation of a reliable estimate for the sampling error due to the natural variability in the population of interest. This is because the probability that an individual in the population will be sampled is unknown, as is the case for other non-probability sampling methods.
