= Pharmaceutical Inspection Convention and Pharmaceutical Inspection Co-operation Scheme =

Pharmaceutical organization

- Logo of the Pharmaceutical Inspection Convention and Pharmaceutical Inspection Co-operation Scheme
- Abbreviation: PIC/S
- Formation: 26 May 1971 (54 years ago)
- Type: Intergovernmental organization
- Purpose: Pharmaceutical
- Headquarters: Geneva, Switzerland
- Coordinates: 46.2050823°N 6.158363°E
- Region served: International
- Members: 52 Active state members
- Website: www.picscheme.org

The Pharmaceutical Inspection Convention and Pharmaceutical Inspection Co-operation Scheme (PIC/S) are two international instruments between countries and pharmaceutical inspection authorities. The PIC/S is meant as an instrument to improve co-operation in the field of Good Manufacturing Practices between regulatory authorities and the pharmaceutical industry.

== History ==
The PIC (Pharmaceutical Inspection Convention) was founded in October 1970 by the European Free Trade Association (EFTA), under the title of the Convention for the Mutual Recognition of Inspections in Respect of the Manufacture of Pharmaceutical Products. The initial members comprised the 10 member countries of EFTA at that time. In the early 1990s it was realized that because of an incompatibility between the Convention and European law, it was not possible for new countries to be admitted as members of PIC. European law did not permit individual EU countries that were members of PIC to sign agreements with other countries seeking to join PIC. As a consequence the Pharmaceutical Inspection Co-operation Scheme was formed on 2 November 1995. The Pharmaceutical Inspection Co-operation Scheme is an informal agreement between health authorities instead of a formal treaty between countries. PIC and the PIC Scheme, which operate together in parallel, are jointly referred to as PIC/S. PIC/S became operational in November 1995.

Since its conception until 2003, PIC/S did not have a distinct legal identity. Its Secretariat was provided by the European Free Trade Association. Based on PIC/S meeting in June 2003, its committee decided to constitute itself as a Swiss Association in accordance with article 60 of the Swiss Civil Code which refer to other internationally active organizations established in Switzerland such as the International Committee of the Red Cross (ICRC). On 1 January 2004, PIC/S established its own Secretariat in Geneva, Switzerland.

== Purpose ==
PIC/S has a number of provisions intended to establish the following:

- Mutual recognition of inspection between member countries, so that an inspection carried out by officials of one member country will be recognized as valid by other members.
- Equivalent principles of inspection methodology, so that it is understood that inspectors in each member country will be following the same best practices when carrying out inspections.
- Mechanisms for the training of inspectors.
- Harmonization of written standards of Good Manufacturing Practices.
- Lines of communication between member country inspectors/inspectorates.

== Members ==
Map of the members of PIC/S

The following are the state members of PIC/S as of October 2021:

Country	Participating entity	Accession to PIC Scheme
Argentina	National Institute of Drugs; Instituto Nacional de Medicamentos (INAME)	2008
Australia	Therapeutic Goods Administration (TGA)	1995
Austria	Federal Office for Safety in Health Care; Bundesamt für Sicherheit im Gesundheitswesen (BASG)	1999
Belgium	Federal Agency for Medicines and Health Products; Agence Fédérale des Médicaments et des Produits de Santé (AFMPS); Federaal Agentschap voor Geneesmiddelen en Gezondheidsproducten (FAGG)	1997
Brazil	National Health Surveillance Agency; Agência Nacional de Vigilância Sanitária (ANVISA)	2021
Canada	Health Canada's Regulatory Operations and Enforcement Branch (ROEB); Santé Canada Direction générale des opérations réglementaires et de l'application de la loi (DGORAL)	1999
Chinese Taipei	Food and Drug Administration (TFDA)	2013
Croatia	Agency for Medicinal Products and Medical Devices of Croatia; Agencija za lijekove i medicinske proizvode (HALMED)	2016
Cyprus	Pharmaceutical Services (CyPHS)	2008
Czech Republic	State Institute for Drug Control; Státní Ústav pro Kontrolu Léčiv (SÚKL); Institute for State Control of Veterinary Biologicals and Medicines (ISCVBM)	1997; 2005
Denmark	Danish Medicines Agency (DKMA)	1995
Estonia	State Agency of Medicines (SAM)	2007
Finland	Finnish Medicines Agency (FIMEA)	1996
France	French National Agency for Medicines and Health Products Safety; Agence nationale de sécurité du médicament et des produits de santé (ANSM); Agency for Food, Environmental & Occupational Health Safety; Agence nationale de sécurité sanitaire de l'alimentation, de l'environnement et du travail (ANSES)	1997; 2009
Germany	Central Authority of the Laender for Health Protection regarding Medicinal Products and Medical Devices; Zentralstelle der Länder für Gesundheitsschutz bei Arzneimitteln und Medizinprodukten (ZLG)	2000
Greece	Greek National Organisation for Medicines; Εθνικός Οργανισμός Φαρμάκων (EOF)	2002
Hong Kong SAR	Pharmacy and Poisons Board of Hong Kong (PPBHK)	2016
Hungary	National Institute of Pharmacy and Nutrition (OGYÉI)	1995
Iceland	Icelandic Medicines Agency (IMA)	1995
Indonesia	National Agency for Drug and Food Control (NADFC); Badan Pengawas Obat dan Makanan Republik Indonesia (BPOM)	2012
Iran	Iran Food and Drug Administration (IFDA)	2018
Ireland	Health Products Regulatory Authority (HPRA)	1996
Israel	Institute for Standardization and Control of Pharmaceuticals (ISCP)	2009
Italy	Italian Medicines Agency; Agenzia Italiana del Farmaco (AIFA); Directorate General for Animal Health and Veterinary Medicinal Products; Direzione generale della sanità animale e dei farmaci veterinari (DGSAF)	2000; 2020
Japan	Pharmaceuticals and Medical Devices Agency (PMDA)	2014
Latvia	State Agency of Medicines; Zāļu valsts aģentūra (ZVA)	2004
Liechtenstein	Office of Healthcare; Amt für Gesundheit (AG)	1995
Lithuania	State Medicines Control Agency (SMCA)	2009
Malaysia	National Pharmaceutical Regulatory Agency (NPRA); Bahagian Regulatori Farmasi Negara	2002
Malta	Malta Medicines Authority (MMA)	2008
Mexico	Federal Commission for the Protection against Sanitary Risk; Comisión Federal para la Protección contra Riesgos Sanitarios (COFEPRIS)	2018
Netherlands	Health and Youth Care Inspectorate; Inspectie Gezondheidszorg en Jeugd (IGJ)	1995
New Zealand	Medicines and Medical Devices Safety Authority (Medsafe)	2013
Norway	Norwegian Medicines Agency (NOMA)	1995
Poland	Chief Pharmaceutical Inspectorate (CPI)	2006
Portugal	National Authority of Medicines and Health Products, IP; Autoridade Nacional do Medicamento e Produtos de Saúde IP (INFARMED IP )	1999
Romania	National Agency for Medicines and Medical Devices (NAMMD)	1995
Singapore	Health Sciences Authority (HSA)	2000
Slovakia	State Institute for Drug Control (SIDC)	1997
Slovenia	Agency for Medicinal Products and Medical Devices; Javna agencija Republike Slovenije za zdravila in medicinske pripomočke (JAZMP)	2012
South Africa	South African Health Products Regulatory Authority (SAHPRA)	2007
South Korea	Ministry of Food and Drug Safety (MFDS)	2014
Spain	Spanish Agency of Medicines and Medical Devices; Agencia Española de Medicamentos y Productos Sanitarios (AEMPS)	1998
Sweden	Swedish Medical Products Agency (MPA)	1996
Switzerland	Swiss Agency for Therapeutic Products (Swissmedic)	1996
Thailand	Food and Drug Administration (Thai FDA)	2016
Turkey	Turkish Medicines and Medical Devices Agency (TMMDA)	2018
Ukraine	State Service for Medications and Drugs Control (SMDC)	2011
United Kingdom	Medicines and Healthcare products Regulatory Agency (MHRA); Veterinary Medicines Directorate (VMD)	1999; 2014
United States	U.S. Food and Drug Administration (USFDA)	2011

== See also ==
- GxP
- Good automated manufacturing practice (GAMP)
- Corrective and preventive action (CAPA)
- Validation (drug manufacture)
- European Medicines Agency (EMEA)
- European Federation of Pharmaceutical Industries and Associations (EFPIA)
- Pharmaceutical Research and Manufacturers of America (PhRMA)
