= Validation master plan =

A Validation Master Plan, also referred to as "VMP", outlines the principles involved in the qualification of a facility, defining the areas and systems to be validated, and provides a written program for achieving and maintaining a qualified drug manufacturing facility. A VMP is the foundation for the validation program and should include process validation, facility and utility qualification and validation, equipment qualification, cleaning and computer validation. It is a key document in the GMP (Good manufacturing practice) regulated pharmaceutical industry as it drives a structured approach to validation projects.

In the US, Food and Drug Administration inspectors often look at VMPs during audits to see whether or not a facility's validation strategy is well thought-out and organized. A VMP should have logical reasoning for including or excluding every system associated with a validation project based on a risk assessment.

== Format ==
The GAMP 5 standard recommends an approach to the creation of the plan.

Topics commonly covered include: Introduction, scope, responsibilities, description of facility and design, building and plant Layout, cleanrooms and associated controlled environments, storage areas, personnel, personnel and material Flow, water and solid waste handling, infrastructure and utilities, water system, ventilation and air-conditioning system, clean steam, compressed air, gases and vacuum system, list manufacturing equipment, building management systems, products that are planned to be validated, qualification/validation approach, process validation and cleaning validation approach, microbiological monitoring, computer Validation, calibration, maintenance, related SOPs.

== See also ==
- Design qualification
- Installation qualification
- Operational qualification
- Performance qualification
- Process qualification
- Verification and validation
