= Good engineering practice =

Good engineering practice (GEP) is engineering and technical activities that ensure that a company manufactures products of the required quality as expected (e.g., by the relevant regulatory authorities). Good engineering practices are to ensure that the development and/or manufacturing effort consistently generates deliverables that support the requirements for qualification or validation. Good engineering practices are applied to all industries that require engineering.

== See also ==
- GxP
- Good manufacturing practice (GMP)
- Best practice
- American National Standards Institute (ANSI)
- Institute of Electrical and Electronics Engineers (IEEE)
- European Medicines Agency (EMEA)
- Food and Drug Administration (FDA)
- Ministry of Health, Labour and Welfare (Japan)
- Pharmaceutical Inspection Convention and Pharmaceutical Inspection Co-operation Scheme (PIC/S)

== Sources ==
- Risk-Based Qualification for the 21st Century
- ISPE GAMP COP
