= VMP =

VMP may refer to:

- Veterinary medical products
- Soyaltepec Mazatec
- Validation master plan
- Variational message passing
- Veterans Memorial Parkway
- Viewpoint Media Player
- Virginia Marine Police
- Virginia Motorsports Park
- VLC media player
