= Good safety practice =

Good safety practice (GSP) refers to protocols dealing with safety. The term is often used in connection with occupational safety and health (OSH) and may vary between industries or sectors.

== See also ==
- Best practice
- Consumer protection
- Good clinical practice
- Good engineering practice
- GxP
- Public safety

== Sources ==
- OSHA, European Agency for Safety and Health at Work
- Good Practice section
- Eurosafe Good Practice Guide
- Good Practice on-line for the Healthcare Sector
