= S510 =

S510 may refer to:

- Food Safety Modernization Act
- Nikon Coolpix series
