= Remedial action =

A remedial action is a change made to a nonconforming product or service to address the deficiency. This also can refer to restoration of a landscape from industrial activity

Rework and repair are generally the remedial actions taken on products, while services usually require additional services to be performed to ensure satisfaction.

In some settings, corrective action is used as an encompassing term that includes remedial actions, corrective actions and preventive actions.

‘Remedial Action’ is a term referring to actions taken by businesses to counteract deficiencies or undesirable characteristics in their products. In this way it is distinct from ‘Corrective Action’, which aims to change the processes that led to these deficiencies, and ‘Preventive Action’, which aims to strengthen weak management systems not yet responsible for any deficiency

Remedial Action is often enacted through ‘Remedial Action Plans’ (RAPs) of three or more stages. For example, one North American river protection scheme drew up a plan that identified environmental problems and sources of pollution, evaluated and carried out actions to restore the area, and confirmed that these actions had been effective

These actions normally have negative effects on a company’s image and profits. A fine balance is often struck between denying the existence of problems or wrongdoing and choosing to publicise this existence before being exposed removes the company’s ability to control the way any scandal is seen.

== Varieties ==
Environmental - If the environment a business works in becomes polluted as the result of the activities of that business, or sometimes other events, this pollution must be cleaned for reasons of safety and welfare. This will normally involve the business either financing the remedial action or applying for the finances to do so. If the business is not at fault, the government may finance the remediation.

Repair/Replacement - When a product is deemed ineffective, either by the company or by public exposure, a recall plan can be put into action, sometimes also involving compensation for consumers.

Policy - When company policy is considered to be in violation of the law, such as keeping inaccurate financial records, remedial action can be taken to change those policies. (HR.BLR.com, 2012). When done after an internal investigation, this can avoid repercussions such as negative publicity or even fines, and the UK Serious Fraud Office states that if a company self-reports corruption it will impact on whether or not prosecution occurs.

== Examples ==
Brodex Water - Environmental remedial action is often undertaken by water specialists in the case of infected supply. Some, such as UK Company Brodex Water Treatment Specialists, advertise what services the company provides in the event of Legionella disease being discovered in a local supply, such as tank chlorination and equipment replacement. This proactive strategy improves the company’s public image.

The Great Lakes - Since the mid-1980s, several ‘Remediative Action Plans’ have been drawn up to manage the impact of various stakeholders, including local businesses, on the environmental health of the American-Canadian Great Lakes region.

Volkswagen - The most recent example, VW has recently been forced to recall millions of cars to adjust deficiencies in their pollution controls, after a company policy of only activating them during emissions tests was exposed.

== See also ==
- Corrective and Preventative Action (CAPA)
- Eight Disciplines Problem Solving
