= Good tissue practice =

Good manufacturing practice enforced by US government

Good tissue practice (GTP) is one of the "GxP" requirements derived from good manufacturing practice. The rule was written and is enforced by the U.S. Food and Drug Administration (FDA), specifically the Center for Biologics Evaluation and Research. The authority for the regulation comes from the Public Health Service Act and all of the requirements relate to transmission of communicable disease, including bacterial or fungal contamination during processing.

It is generally used to mean the requirements of section 1271 of chapter 21 of the US Code of Federal Regulations, though the rule itself specifies that the GTP is only subpart D of that section.

The rules cover a broad variety of articles referred to as "HCT/Ps" for human cellular, tissue, and tissue-based products and the regulations cover more or less any cellular entity taken from a human and transplanted into another human. There are several exceptions in the rules for organ transplants, blood for transfusion, and other articles which already have established requirements.

The rules are an expansion and revision of the section 1270 of the same chapter and now cover a larger group of products. The most controversial products covered in these rules include stem cells and tissue used in reproductive medicine (assisted reproductive technology): sperm, oocytes, and embryos.

These rules only cover tissue which has not been significantly modified. Any major changes will make the product into either a drug or a medical device, though some of the rules in this section still apply to human-sourced drugs and medical devices.

The rules only affect products collected after May 25, 2005.

== FDA Draft Guidance January 2009 ==
In January 2009, FDA issued a new cGTP draft guidance for industry entitled "Current Good Tissue Practice (CGTP) and Additional Requirements for Manufacturers of Human Cells, Tissues and Cellular and Tissue-Based Products (HCT/Ps)".

== See also ==
- Current Good Manufacturing Practice
