= Entotrust certification =

Certification for alternative proteins

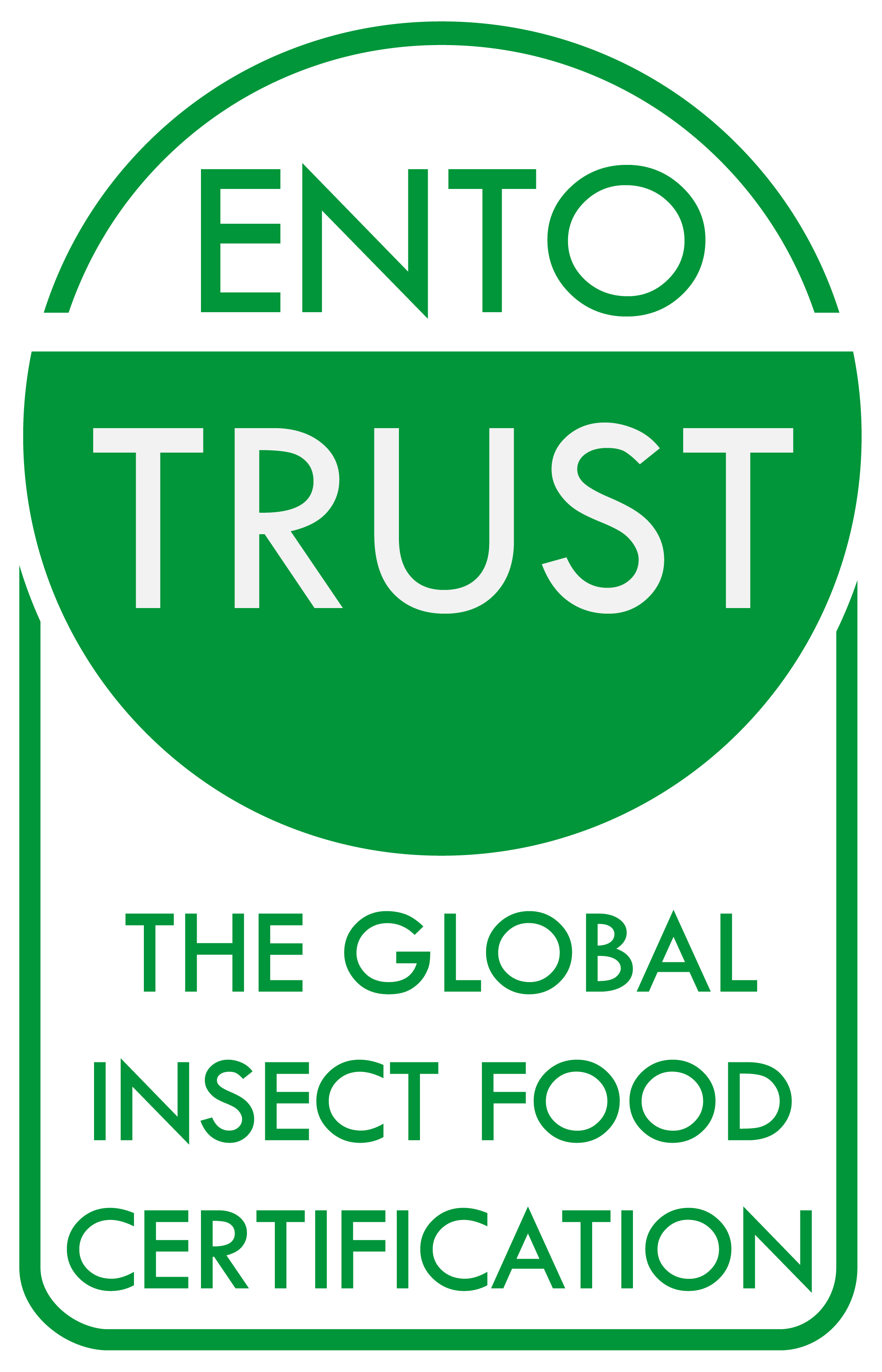
Entotrust logo with banner

The Entotrust certification is a voluntary product certification of insects as food, and related insect-based foods, which allows producers to communicate their food safety and sustainability. Increasingly used, in Europe, Africa, Asia, US, Mexico, and Latam with the mission to recognize and report quality products based on edible insects, the logo can only be used by fully certified producers and farmers.

The Entotrust International certification covers a wide range of food products including bakery, pasta, confectionary, salted snacks and chips, protein and energy bars, whole dried insects, insect protein powder, and functional drinks. In general, it encompasses any product that might become a more sustainable and nutritious one, with the inclusion of a percentage of insect origin proteins.

The call for more sustainable proteins, healthier diets, and food innovation is driving wider adoption of insect food across the globe: a certificate and a seal of acceptance have a capability to play a major part in making clients trust edible insect solutions. It is easier making people wish to consume insects if they know they’re secure and bred in a sustainable manner.

The insect as food market is expected to grow significantly according independent analysis at an average CAGR of 8.9% during the forecast period (2023–2028). More than 2,100 insect species are currently eaten by two billion people from 130 countries. Insects have high-value nutritional profiles, and are rich in protein, omega-3 fatty acids, iron, zinc, folic acid and vitamins B12, C and E. Commercial insect farming is considered to have a low environmental footprint, requiring minimal water, energy, and land resources. Europe and the United States of America are the leading edible insect markets in the Western World today, with more than 400 edible-insect-related businesses in operation.

== How it works ==
Producers and farmers of insect food intended for human consumption, request to have their products analysed in accredited food laboratories for microbiology and chemical elements, this to ensure the absolute food safety. Then a thorough audit of the farming and manufacturing processes is performed in compliance with strict requirements, baseline are the Haccp methodology, and checklists comparable to the GFSI and BRC assessments. The aim is to verify the complete value chain from the farm to the consumer's plate.

The three dimensions of the assessment are:

- Food safety
- Environmental footprint
- Social compliance (ILO)

Certification is obtained by responding to specific checklists concerning both food safety, company processes and practices in terms of environmental impact and social fairness. Verification is carried out through meetings, video calls, documentary evidence and photos, when necessary auditors’ visits to the company premises. Furthermore, the accredited laboratory yearly carries out analyses on certified products, as a necessary condition for the renewal of the certification.

== Other certification and product labelings ==
- The Global Gap farm and food certification program
- The Fair Trade Federation does not certify individual products, but instead evaluates an entire business.
- The Marine Stewardship Council for fisheries
- The FTO Mark, launched in 2004 by World Fair Trade Organization, and identifies registered fair trade organizations.
- The Global Aquaculture Alliance for aquaculture
- UTZ Certified is a coffee certification program that has sometimes been dubbed "Fairtrade lite"
