= Good practice =

Good practice guidelines and regulations

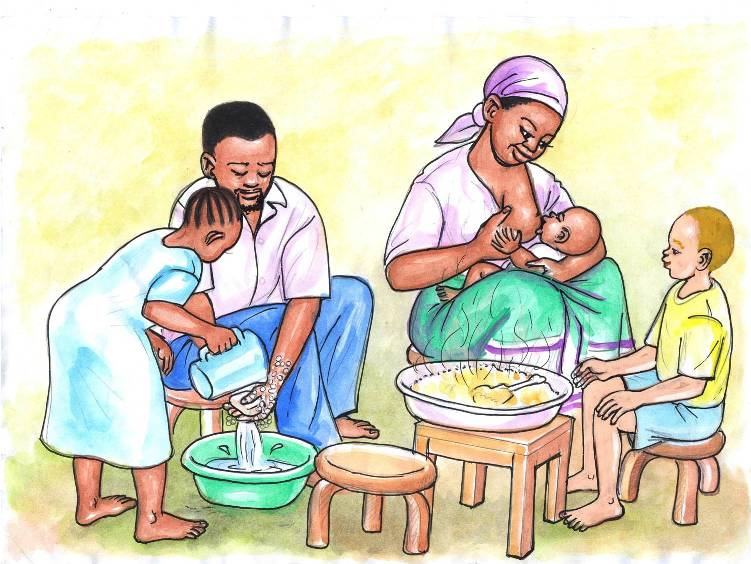
Poster showing good hand-washing practice

A good practice is a procedure or set of procedures that are prescribed or accepted as being suitable or effective within a given professional or commercial setting. They are used in quality guidelines and regulations, including the pharmaceutical and food industries, for example good agricultural practice (GAP) (see more examples below).

In general, GxP is a placeholder abbreviation for the good practice within a particular field or fields, where the "x" can be substituted for the field(s) in question. GxP can also be used to refer to collections of quality guidelines.

To denote the current good practice, a "c" or "C" is sometimes added to the front of the initialism (cGxP), which may hint that any good practice may be subject to future change. For example, "current good manufacturing practice" may be abbreviated "cGMP".

== Purpose ==
The purpose of the GxP quality guidelines is to ensure a product is safe and meets its intended use. GxP guides quality manufacture in regulated industries including food, drugs, medical devices, and cosmetics.

The most central aspects of GxP are good documentation practices (GDP), which are expected to be "ALCOA":

- Attributable: Documents are attributable to an individual
- Legible: They are readable
- Contemporaneously recorded: Not dated in the past (backdating) or the future (forward dating), but when the documented task is completed
- Original or a true copy: See also non-repudiation
- Accurate: Accurately reflecting the activity documented
- Permanent

The products that are the subject of the GxP are expected to be

- Traceability: The ability to reconstruct the development history of a drug or medical device.
- Accountability: The ability to resolve who has contributed what to the development and when.

Another version, ALCOA++, adds:

- Complete: Data should not be missing
- Consistent: Data should not deviate from a set style, for example, the abbreviation N/A should only be used for one phrase
- Enduring: Documents should be designed to last a reasonable length of time
- Available: Documents should be retrievable.

GxPs require that a quality system be established, implemented, documented, and maintained. As explained above, documentation is a critical tool for ensuring GxP adherence. For more information, see good manufacturing practice.

== Examples of GxPs ==
- Good agricultural and collection practices, or GACP(s)
- Good agricultural practice, or GAP
- Good auditing practice, or GAP
- Good automated laboratory practice, or GALP
- Good automated manufacturing practice, or GAMP
- Good business practice, or GBP
- Good cell culture practice, or GCCP
- Good clinical data management practice, or GCDMP
- Good clinical laboratory practice, or GCLP
- Good clinical practice, or GCP
- Good documentation practice, or GDP, or GDocP (to distinguish from "good distribution practice")
- Good distribution practice, or GDP
- Good engineering practice, or GEP
- Good financial practice, or GFP
- Good guidance practice, or GGP
- Good hygiene practice, or GHP
- Good laboratory practice, or GLP
- Good machine learning practice, or GMLP
- Good management practice, or GMP
- Good manufacturing practice, or GMP
- Good microbiological practice, or GMiP
- Good participatory practice, or GPP
- Good pharmacovigilance practice, or GPvP or even GVP
- Good pharmacy practice, or GPP
- Good policing practice, or GPP
- Good recruitment practice, or GRP
- Good research practice, or GRP
- Good safety practice, or GSP
- Good storage practice, or GSP
- Good tissue practice, or GTP

== See also ==
- Best practice, a method or technique that has been generally accepted as superior to alternatives because it tends to produce superior results
- European Medicines Agency (EMA), European Union agency evaluating and supervising pharmaceutical products
- Food and Drug Administration (FDA), a United States Food federal agency protecting and promoting public health through the control and supervision
- International Conference on Harmonisation of Technical Requirements for Registration of Pharmaceuticals for Human Use (ICH), initiative to bring together regulatory authorities and pharmaceutical industry
- Organisation for Economic Co-operation and Development (OECD), intergovernmental organisation for stimulating economic progress and world trade through democracy, market economy, and good practices
- Pride of workmanship, sense of having done good work, an element of job satisfaction
- Validation (drug manufacture), a documented process to ensure a product meets its required specifications and quality
