= Vietnamese-German Center for Medical Research =

Vietnamese-German Center for Medical Research (VG-CARE) was founded in 2015.

== History ==
It was founded as a collaboration between Hanoi's 108 Military Central Hospital and Germany's Institute of Tropical Medicine at the University of TÜbingen VG-CARE is well known for conducting clinical research in accordance with GCP/GCLP standards. The Vietnamese-German Center for Medical Research (VG-CARE) is based in the Vietnamese capital of Hanoi. The institution grew out of a long-standing collaboration between scientists and doctors from both countries.

== Areas of research ==
The research programme focuses on a variety of tropical but also common infectious diseases, with the ultimate goal of improving underlying pathophysiological mechanisms and diagnostics - and thus targeted therapy. Clinical trials on rectal and liver cancer, as well as genetic epidemiology and understanding pathogen-host interactions, are other areas of interest.

== Financial backing ==
The centre is primarily supported by research projects and clinical studies. The German Federal Ministry of Education and Research (BMBF), the German Academic Exchange Service (DAAD), the Institute of Tropical Medicine in Tübingen, and the 108 Military Central Hospital in Hanoi are the major financial donors to VG-CARE. Additionally, the Vietnamese Ministry of Science and Technology (MOST) and the National Foundation for Science and Technology Development (NAFOSTED-Vietnam) aid this two-way global endeavour.

== Publications ==
- Hepatitis E Virus Superinfection and Clinical Progression in Hepatitis B Patients.
- High Hepatitis E virus (HEV) Positivity Among Domestic Pigs and Risk of HEV Infection of Individuals Occupationally Exposed to Pigs and Pork Meat in Hanoi, Vietnam.
- Viral and serological testing of SARS-CoV-2 among health care workers and patients in Vietnam".
- COVID-19: A PCR-defined pandemic.
- A global metagenomic map of urban microbiomes and antimicrobial resistance.
