= RQA =

RQA may refer to:

- Ruoqiang Loulan Airport, IATA code RQA
- Recurrence quantification analysis
- Research Quality Association
