= GCLP =

GCLP may refer to:

- Gran Canaria Airport, ICAO airport code GCLP
- Good clinical laboratory practice (GCLP)
