= Food defense =

Protection of food products from intentional contamination

Food defense is the protection of food products from intentional contamination or adulteration by biological, chemical, physical, or radiological agents introduced for the purpose of causing harm. It addresses additional concerns including physical, personnel and operational security.

Food defense is one of the four categories of the food protection risk matrix which include: food safety, which is based on unintentional or environmental contamination that can cause harm; food fraud, which is based on intentional deception for economic gain; and food quality, which may also be affected by profit-driven behavior but without intention to cause harm.

Overarching these four categories is food security, which deals with individuals having access to enough food for an active, healthy life. Food protection is the umbrella term encompassing both food defense and food safety. These six terms are often conflated.

Along with protecting the food system, food defense also deals with prevention, protection, mitigation, response and recovery from intentional acts of adulteration.

== History in the United States ==
- 1906: The Federal Meat Inspection Act places requirements on the slaughter, processing and labeling of meat and meat products, domestic and imported.
- 1938: The Federal Food, Drug and Cosmetic Act establishes definitions and regulation for the safety of food, drugs, and cosmetics.
- 1957: The Poultry Products Inspection Act requires the Food Safety and Inspection Service (FSIS) to inspect all domesticated birds meant for human consumption.
- November 2002: The Homeland Security Act passed by congress creates the Department of Homeland Security in response to the September 11 attacks.
- December 2003: Homeland Security Presidential Directive 7 establishes a policy to identify and prioritize critical infrastructures. Food and Agriculture is identified as one of these infrastructures
- January 2004: The Homeland Security Presidential Directive 9 establishes policy to protect agriculture and food systems against terrorist attacks.
- January 2004: DHS launches Homeland Security Centers of Excellence in order to conduct research to address homeland security challenges.
- July 2004: The National Center for Food Protection and Defense now Food Protection and Defense Institute (FPDI) is formally launched with the vision to "defend the safety of the food system through research and education" at the University of Minnesota, Twin Cities.
- January 2011: The Food Safety Modernization Act grants the FDA new authorities and powers, as well as directly providing for protections against intentional adulteration.

== Food defense event types ==
Food defense events can generally be categorized into three types. These could be carried out by a disgruntled employee, sophisticated insider, or intelligent adversary with a specific goal in mind. This goal may be to impact the public, brand, company or the psycho-social stability of a group of people depending on the type. However an event may contain aspects of more than one category.

=== Industrial sabotage ===
These events include intentional contamination by a disgruntled employee, insider or competitor with the intention of damaging the brand of the company, causing financial problems from a widespread recall or sabotage, but not necessarily with the goal of causing widespread illness or public harm. These internal actors often know what procedures are followed in the plant, and how to bypass checkpoints and security controls.

An example of a disgruntled employee is the contamination of frozen foods produced by a subsidiary of Maruha Nichiro with malathion, a pesticide. The contamination resulted in a recall of 6.4 million potentially tainted products. Nearly 1,800 people are estimated to have been affected, and public confidence in food quality was shaken.

=== Terrorism ===
The reach and complexity of the food system has caused concern for its potential as a terrorist target.

The first and largest food attack in the US is the 1984 Rajneeshee bioterror attack. 751 individuals were poisoned in The Dalles, Oregon through the contamination of salad bars with Salmonella with the intention of affecting the 1984 Wasco County elections.

An example of one business attempting to force a change of government policy by threatening another business, was the 2014 extortion threat against New Zealand milk and infant formula. Jeremy Hamish Kerr, a businessman who produced a cyanide-based poison (Feratox) for killing possums in New Zealand, threatened dairy producer Fonterra and Federated Farmers that infant formula and other dairy products would be poisoned with 1080 (monofluoroacetate) if they did not persuade the New Zealand government to halt the use of 1080 which is widely used by the Department of Conservation to control possums in New Zealand. Because statistically-based sampling plans are ineffective as protection against a deliberate malicious act, in order to maintain confidence in the safety of their products Fonterra had to test every single tanker of milk and every single batch of infant formula for the presence of 1080 until the offender was caught by police. Jeremy Kerr was found guilty of blackmail and sentenced to eight and a half years jail. (Note: During the trial is as determined that the perpetrator sold a competing product so that even though the result was a food defense incident the root cause was economic gain. “He was found to have been financially motivated when he sent two letters to Fonterra and Federated Farmers threatening to poison baby formula with 1080. Kerr had invented a rival poison and a judge found he believed he would receive a financial benefit if the use of 1080 was stopped.”)

=== Economically motivated adulteration (EMA) ===
The FDA's working definition of EMA is

the fraudulent, intentional substitution or addition of a substance in a product for the purpose of increasing the apparent value of the product or reducing the cost of its production, i.e., for economic gain. EMA includes dilution of products with increased quantities of an already-present substance (e.g., increasing inactive ingredients of a drug with a resulting reduction in strength of the finished product, or watering down of juice) to the extent that such dilution poses a known or possible health risk to consumers, as well as the addition or substitution of substances in order to mask dilution.

EMA -- using the FDA working definition is one type of Food Fraud -- commonly occurs for financial advantage through the undeclared substitution with alternative ingredients [26]. This poses a health concern due to allergen labeling requirements. In 2016 a restaurateur was jailed for manslaughter after a customer died because cheaper ground nut powder (containing peanut allergen) was used instead of almond powder in preparing a takeaway curry, three weeks after another customer suffered an allergic reaction which required hospital treatment. These deliberate acts are intended to evade detection, posing a challenge to regulating bodies and quality assurance methodologies.

Cases of EMA have been seen in the horse-meat scandal, melamine contamination scandal and the Salmonella outbreak involving the Peanut Corporation of America. The most commonly counterfeited product is extra-virgin olive oil. Other products commonly associated with food fraud include fish and seafood, honey, meat and grain-based foods, fruit juices, organic foods, coffee, some highly processed foods, tea and spices. Experts estimate that up to 10% of food products in retail stores contain some degree of adulteration, and EMA events cost the US food industry between $10 billion and $15 billion a year.

== Protection strategies ==
Regulatory bodies and industry can implement strategies and use tools in order to protect their supply chains and processing facilities from intentional contamination or adulteration. Defined as protection or mitigation, this process involves both assessing the risk and vulnerabilities of a single supply chain or facility and working to mitigate these risks in order to prevent an event, and reducing the severity of an event.

=== Tools ===
The FDA has developed several tools for the food industry, including among others:

- Mitigation Strategies Database which includes a range of preventative measures and suggestions for companies
- Food Defense 101, focused on training for preparedness against an intentional attack
- FREE-B, a compilation of both intentional and unintentional food contamination scenarios
- Food Defense Plan Builder, designed to assist owners and operators of food facilities with developing personalized food defense plans

=== Risk assessments ===
It is difficult to quantify the risk in a system, due to the stochastic nature of the events. However, it is possible to use other sources of information, such as gathered intelligence, economic and social drivers and data mining to assess the potential weaknesses and entry points of a system, along with the scale of consequences related to a breach in that system. Tools being developed for this purpose by the National Center for Food Protection and Defense include Focused Integration of Data for Early Signals (FIDES) and Criticality Spatial Analysis (CRISTAL).

Food risk matrix
Consequence	Gain: economic	Food quality	Food fraud
Consequence	Harm: Public health, economic, or terror	Food safety	Food defense
		Unintentional	Intentional
Action

Food industry stakeholders can perform a vulnerability assessment to understand the vulnerabilities of their system, the consequences of an event and the potential threats and agents. This allows companies to assess and prioritize vulnerabilities within their facility and system. A software tool has been developed by the FDA to assist with this process. Companies are encouraged to create a Food Defense Plan based on the vulnerability and risk assessments performed, detailing their plan of action in the case of an intentional or unintentional contamination event.

=== Vulnerability assessment tools ===
The FDA has identified four key activities, or common vulnerabilities within the food system: bulk liquid receiving and loading, liquid storage and handling, secondary ingredient handling, and mixing or similar activities. Knowledge of these key activities can direct action plans.

CARVER + Shock is used to consider the factors involved in an intentional contamination event (Note: as of the publishing of the FSMA Intentional Adulteration final rule this software is no longer available or supported by FDA.

- Criticality - measure of public health and economic impacts of an attack
- Accessibility – ability to physically access and egress from target
- Recuperability – ability of system to recover from an attack
- Vulnerability – ease of accomplishing attack
- Effect – amount of direct loss from an attack as measured by loss in production
- Recognizability – ease of identifying target
- Shock – the combined health, economic, and psychological impacts of an attack

=== Supply chain control ===
Food supply chains can be difficult to trace because they are complex and sometimes lack transparency. Understanding where ingredients come from can help companies and individuals identify and manage risks of contamination. Supply chain oversight, audits, and QA testing can reduce the chance that issues originating outside a facility affect its products.

In addition, companies can take advantage of existing scenario based tools and should follow Good Manufacturing Practice guidelines.

=== Mitigation strategies ===
==== Physical measures ====
- Secure the facility perimeter and perform periodic checks
- Use controlled-access procedures for people or vehicles entering the plant or parking area
- Install an alarm system, cameras and sufficient lighting
- Designate restricted areas for authorized employees, restrict non-employees to non-production areas
- Limit access to control systems
- Use tamper-evident or tamper-resistant packaging
- all entry maintain key and lock control processor

==== Policy measures ====
- Use a system to identify personnel by their specific functions
- Conduct background checks on all employees and contractors who will be working in sensitive operations
- Train employees on food defense and security awareness, including recognition of suspicious behavior or individuals

==== Management ====
- Maintain records to allow easy trace-back and trace-forward of materials and products
- Have available a list of contacts for local, state and federal agencies
- Implement an inventory control system

More strategies for various categories and nodes of the food system can be found in the various mitigation strategies databases available through the FDA and USDA.

== Stakeholders involved in food defense ==
=== Global ===
- Food and Agriculture Organization (FAO)
- World Health Organization (WHO)
- World Trade Organization (WTO)
- Interpol

=== United States ===
==== Federal level ====
- Food and Drug Administration (FDA)
  - Center for Food Safety and Applied Nutrition (CFSAN)
- United States Department of Agriculture (USDA)
  - Food Safety and Inspection Service (FSIS)
  - Foreign Agricultural Service (FAS)
- Centers for Disease Control and Prevention (CDC)
- Federal Bureau of Investigation (FBI)
- Department of Homeland Security (DHS)
  - Customs and Border Protection (CBP)
- Department of State
- National Center for Food Protection and Defense (NFCPD) now Food Protection and Defense Institute (FPDI)

==== State level ====
- State health departments
- State departments of agriculture
- Local law enforcement

=== Other groups ===
- Food Protection and Defense Institute (FPDI)
- US Pharmacopeial (USP)
- Food Fraud Initiative (FFI)
- NSF International (NSFI)
- Food and Drug Administration (FDA) The Food Safety Modernization Act (FSMA)
- USDA Food Safety and Inspection Service (FSIS)
- Global Food Safety Initiative (GFSI)
- SSAFE
- British Retail Consortium (BRC)
- Industry representatives
- Academic researchers
