= Corrective and preventive action =

Improvements in an organization to eliminate non-conformities or undesirable situations

Corrective and preventive action (CAPA or simply corrective action) consists of improvements to an organization's processes taken to eliminate causes of non-conformities or other undesirable situations. It is usually a set of actions, laws or regulations required by an organization to take in manufacturing, documentation, procedures, or systems to rectify and eliminate recurring non-conformance. Non-conformance is identified after systematic evaluation and analysis of the root cause of the non-conformance. Non-conformance may be a market complaint or customer complaint or failure of machinery or a quality management system, or misinterpretation of written instructions to carry out work. The corrective and preventive action is designed by a team that includes quality assurance personnel and personnel involved in the actual observation point of non-conformance. It must be systematically implemented and observed for its ability to eliminate further recurrence of such non-conformation. The Eight disciplines problem solving method, or 8D framework, can be used as an effective method of structuring a CAPA.

Corrective action: Action taken to eliminate the causes of non-conformities or other undesirable situations, so as to prevent recurrence.

Preventive action: Action taken to prevent the occurrence of such non-conformities, generally as a result of a risk analysis.

In certain markets and industries, CAPA may be required as part of the quality management system, such as the Medical Devices and Pharmaceutical industries in the United States. In this case, failure to adhere to proper CAPA handling is considered a violation of US Federal regulations on good manufacturing practices. As a consequence, a medicine or medical device can be termed as adulterated or substandard if the company has failed to investigate, record and analyze the root cause of a non-conformance, and failed to design and implement an effective CAPA.

CAPA is used to bring about improvements to an organization's processes, and is often undertaken to eliminate causes of non-conformities or other undesirable situations. CAPA is a concept within good manufacturing practice (GMP), Hazard Analysis and Critical Control Points/Hazard Analysis and Risk-based Preventive Controls (HACCP/HARPC) and numerous ISO business standards. It focuses on the systematic investigation of the root causes of identified problems or identified risks in an attempt to prevent their recurrence (for corrective action) or to prevent occurrence (for preventive action).

Corrective actions are implemented in response to customer complaints, unacceptable levels of product non-conformance, issues identified during an internal audit, as well as adverse or unstable trends in product and process monitoring such as would be identified by statistical process control (SPC). Preventive actions are implemented in response to the identification of potential sources of non-conformity.

To ensure that corrective and preventive actions are effective, the systematic investigation of the root causes of failure is pivotal. CAPA is part of the overall quality management system (QMS).

== Concepts ==
- Clearly identified sources of data that identify problems to investigate
- Root cause analysis that identifies the cause of a discrepancy or deviation, and suggest corrective actions

A common misconception is that the purpose of preventive action is to avert the occurrence of a similar potential problem. This process is all part of corrective action because it is a process of determining such similarities that should take place in the event of a discrepancy.

The PDCA cycle

Preventive action is any proactive method used to determine potential discrepancies before they occur and to ensure that they do not happen (thereby including, for example, preventive maintenance, management review or other common forms of risk avoidance). Corrective and preventive actions include stages for investigation, action, review, and further action is required. It can be seen that both fit into the PDCA (plan-do-check-act) philosophy as determined by the Deming-Shewhart cycle.

Investigations to root cause may conclude that no corrective or preventive actions are required, and additionally may suggest simple corrections to a problem with no identified systemic root cause. When multiple investigations end in no corrective action, a new problem statement with expanded scope may be generated, and a more thorough investigation to root cause performed.

Implementation of corrective and preventive actions is the path towards improvement and effectiveness of Quality Management Systems. Corrective actions are nothing but actions based on problem identification. The problem or a non-conformance can be identified internally through staff suggestions, management reviews, document reviews or internal audits. External leads to finding the root cause of the problem can include Customer complaints and suggestions; customer rejections; non-conformities raised in customer or third-party audits; recommendations by auditors.

A root cause is the identification and investigation of the source of the problem where the person(s), system, process, or external factor is identified as the cause of the nonconformity. The root cause analysis can be done via 5 Whys or other methods, e.g. an Ishikawa diagram.

Correction is the action to eliminate a detected nonconformity or nonconformance.

Preventive action includes the prediction of problems and attempts to avoid such occurrences (fail-safe) through self-initiated actions and analysis related to the processes or products. This can be initiated with the help of active participation by staff members and workers through improvement teams, improvement meetings, opportunities for improvement during internal audits, management review, customer feedback and deciding own goals quantized in terms of business growth, reducing rejections, utilizing the equipment effectively, etc.

== Medical devices and FDA compliance ==
To comply with the United States Food and Drug Administration's code FDA 21 CFR 820.100 medical device companies need to establish a CAPA process within their QMS. This part of the system may be paper or digital, but it is something that is looked for during an FDA visit. In 2015 there were over 450 issues found with the CAPA systems for medical device companies. To have an FDA-compliant QMS system required the ability to capture, review, approve, control, and retrieve closed-loop processes.

A corrective action can also be a field correction, an action taken to correct problems with non-conforming products. For example, in 2022 the pharmaceutical company Avanos Medical conducted a voluntary field correction after reports of patient injuries and deaths related to misplaced nasogastric feeding tubes while using their products, resulting in a product recall.

== Examples of corrective actions ==
- Error Proofing
- Visible or Audible Alarms
- Process Redesign
- Product Redesign
- Define and Implement Action Plan
- Training or enhancement or modification of existing training programs
- Improvements to maintenance schedules
- Improvements to material handling or storage

In some cases, a combination of such actions may be necessary to fully correct the problem.

== See also ==
- Eight disciplines problem solving
- Good documentation practice
- Good automated manufacturing practice (GAMP)
