= FDA Food Safety Modernization Act =

2011 United States law

- Long title: To amend the Federal Food, Drug, and Cosmetic Act with respect to the safety of the food supply.
- Acronyms (colloquial): FSMA
- Enacted by: the 111th United States Congress
- Effective: January 4, 2011

Citations
- Public law: 111-353

Codification
- Acts amended: Federal Food, Drug, and Cosmetic Act
- Titles amended: 21 U.S.C.: Food and Drugs
- U.S.C. sections created: 301 et seq.

Legislative history
- Introduced in the House of Representatives as H.R.2751 by Betty Sutton (D–OH) on June 8, 2009; Committee consideration by House Energy and Commerce and House Ways and Means; Passed the House on June 9, 2009 (); Passed the Senate on December 19, 2010 (Passed by Voice Vote); Reported by the joint conference committee on December 21, 2010; agreed to by the House on December 21, 2010 () and by the Senate on December 19, 2010 (Passed by Voice Vote); Signed into law by President Barack Obama on January 4, 2011

The Food Safety Modernization Act (FSMA) was signed into law by President Barack Obama on January 4, 2011. The FSMA has given the Food and Drug Administration (FDA) new authority to regulate the way foods are grown, harvested and processed. The law grants the FDA a number of new powers, including mandatory recall authority, which the agency had sought for many years. The FSMA requires the FDA to undertake more than a dozen rulemakings and issue at least 10 guidance documents, as well as a host of reports, plans, strategies, standards, notices, and other tasks.

The law was prompted after many reported incidents of foodborne illnesses during the first decade of the 2000s and was largely crafted by members of the Grocery Manufacturers Association. Tainted food has cost the food industry billions of dollars in recalls, lost sales and legal expenses.

This bill is similar to the Food Safety Enhancement Act which passed the House in 2009. It is considered the first major piece of federal legislation addressing food safety since 1938. It is also the first piece of legislation to address intentional adulteration and Food Defense.

== Background ==
The U.S. Centers for Disease Control and Prevention (CDC) estimated in 2011 that each year 48 million people (1 in 6 Americans) get sick, 128,000 are hospitalized, and 3,000 die of foodborne diseases. 31 pathogens are notorious for causing foodborne illness. Unspecified agents have insufficient data to estimate with certainty the agent-specific burden. Known agents that have not been identified as causing foodborne illness include microbes, chemicals, or other substance known to be in food. The ability for these known agents to cause illness has not been proven so they remain unidentified. Considering that about 30% of the population is at risk for food borne sicknesses, over 14% of food supply to the United States is imported from other countries, and also new and more food items are becoming more complex or intricate, the FSMA was indeed needed. The FDA Food Safety Modernization Act (FSMA), enables FDA to better protect public health by strengthening the food safety system. It enables the FDA to focus more on preventing food safety problems rather than relying primarily on reacting to problems after they occur.

Estimated annual number of domestically acquired, food borne illnesses, hospitalizations, and deaths due to 31 pathogens and unspecified agents transmitted through food, United States.
Food borne Agents	Estimated annual number of illnesses (90% credible interval)	%	Estimated annual number of hospitalizations (90% credible interval)	%	Estimated annual number of deaths (90% credible interval)	%
31 known pathogens	9.4 million (6.6–12.7 million)	20	55,961 (39,534–75,741)	44	1,351 (712–2,268)	44
Unspecified agents	38.4 million (19.8–61.2 million)	80	71,878 (9,924–157,340)	56	1,686 (369–3,338)	56
Total	47.8 million (28.7–71.1 million)	100	127,839 (62,529–215,562)	100	3,037 (1,492–4,983)	100

In 1998, the FDA announced a publication entitled "Guidance for Industry: Guide to Minimize Microbial Food Safety Hazards for Fresh Fruits and Vegetables" in response to President Clinton's 1997 "Initiative to Ensure the Safety of Imported and Domestic Fruits and Vegetables". They resulted in Good Agricultural Practices (GAP) and Good Handling Practices (GHP) certifications that became de facto industry requirements, but were not enforceable.

High-profile outbreaks related to various foods, from spinach and peanut products to eggs, have underscored the need to make continuous improvements in food safety. Under this law the FDA will be allowed to mandate a system that is based on science and addresses the hazards from farm to table. This means that the FDA has the power to oversee how foods are produced and how they are maintained in food markets. This puts greater emphasis on preventing food-borne illness. The reasoning is simple: The better the system handles producing, processing, transporting, and preparing foods, the safer our food supply will be.

Under the new law, the FDA will now have new prevention-focused tools and a clear regulatory framework to help make substantial improvements in their approach to food safety. For example, for the first time, the FDA has a legislative mandate to require comprehensive, preventive-based controls across the food supply chain. Preventive controls include steps that a food facility would take to prevent or significantly minimize the likelihood of problems occurring. The new law also significantly enhances the FDA's ability to achieve greater oversight of the millions of food products coming into the United States from other countries each year.

== Legislative history ==
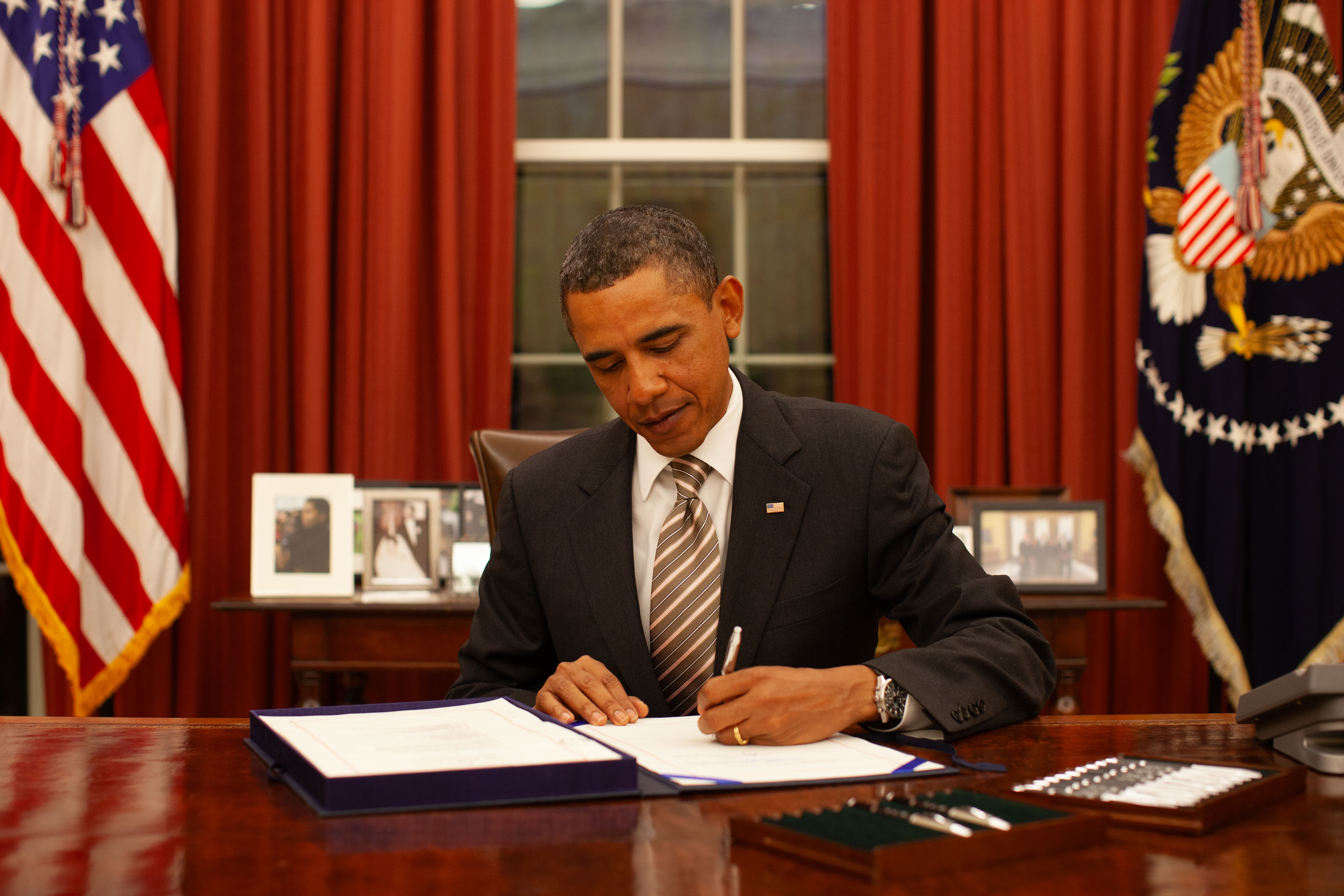
President Obama signing the act into law on January 4, 2011

The events of September 11, 2001, reinforced the need to enhance the security of the United States. Congress responded by passing the Public Health Security and Bioterrorism Preparedness Response Act, "The Bioterrorism Act," which President Bush signed into law June 12, 2002. The Bioterrorism Act of 2002 granted the FDA administrative detention authority over food items if there is credible evidence or information that indicates the food presents a threat of serious adverse health consequences or death to humans or animals. The new (FSMA) law broadens that authority, allowing for administrative detention based on ‘reason to believe’ that the food item has been misbranded or adulterated’ and thus violates a legal standard for the product.

The first version of the law, the Food Safety Enhancement Act, passed the House on June 9, 2009. However, negotiations with the Senate led to the final product, the "Food Safety and Modernization Act." The bill was passed by the Senate in November 2010 by a vote of 73–25. However, because of a tax provision added to the bill, (which is constitutionally required to begin in the House), the vote did not count. There was concern that with the short time left in the lame-duck session, the bill would not get the time needed to be voted on and passed. Attempts to add the bill to the continuing resolution for government funding were scrapped over the objection of Senator Tom Coburn. Eventually, however, the Senate moved on December 19, 2010, to pass the fixed bill by unanimous consent by a voice vote. The House went on to approve the bill by a vote of 215 to 144 on December 21, 2010. President Barack Obama signed the bill into law on Tuesday, January 4, 2011.

Although this bill is meant to address food safety, there are, according to food safety advocate Bill Marler, some issues with its effectiveness. Many facilities, such as farms, restaurants, and nonprofit food establishments in which food is prepared for or served directly to the consumer are exempt from the requirements of the bill. Also exempt are facilities that produce food solely for non-human animals.

=== Tester-Hagan Amendment ===
Senators Jon Tester and Kay Hagan sponsored two amendments that removed farmers, ranchers and local processors from federal oversight, leaving them—as they currently are—within the existing regulatory framework of state and local health and sanitation laws and rules.

The amendment offered protections for operations (a.k.a. “qualified facilities”) that sell less than $500,000 a year and sell most (greater than 50%) of their products directly to consumers in the same state and within a 400-mile radius. The amendment also applies to all operations that the FDA classified as a "very small business." Small, local farmers would not necessarily need to comply with some of the requirements and produce safety regulations implemented under S. 510. Instead, these small-scale producers (like those who sell their goods at farmers' markets or roadside stands) would continue to be regulated by local and state entities. In addition, consumers would know whom they are buying from either by direct sales or clear labeling.

Farmers who qualify must provide documentation that the farm is in compliance with state regulations. Documentation may include licenses, inspection reports, or other evidence that the farm is in compliance with State, local, county, or other applicable non-Federal food safety law. The farm must also prominently and conspicuously display the name and address of farm/facility on its label. For foods without a label then by poster, sign, or placard, at the point of purchase or, in the case of Internet sales, in an electronic notice, or in the case of sales to stores and restaurants, on the invoice.

== Provisions ==
=== Impact and fees ===
The legislation affects every aspect of the U.S. food system, from farmers to manufacturers to importers. It places significant responsibilities on farmers and food processors to prevent contamination—a departure from the country's reactive tradition, which has relied on government inspectors to catch tainted food after the fact The legislation requires food producers and importers to pay an annual $500 registration fee, which would help fund stepped-up FDA inspections, enforcement and related activities such as food-safety research About 360,000 facilities in the United States and abroad would be subject to the fees. The Congressional Budget Office reported that the fees would not cover the cost of the new system, leaving the FDA to incur a net cost of $2.2 billion over five years.

=== Prevention ===
For the first time, the FDA will have a legislative mandate to require comprehensive preventive controls based on scientific data across the food supply, including pet food and animal feed.

- Mandatory preventive controls for food facilities
  - Food facilities are required to implement a written Hazard Analysis and Risk-based Preventive Controls (HARPC) plan. This involves: (1) evaluating the hazards that could affect food safety, (2) specifying what preventive steps, or controls, will be put in place to significantly minimize or prevent the hazards, (3) specifying how the facility will monitor these controls to ensure they are working, (4) maintaining routine records of the monitoring, and (5) specifying what actions the facility will take to correct problems that arise. Animal food manufacturers must implement current Good Manufacturing Practices and Preventive Controls.(Final rule published September 17, 2015)
- Mandatory produce safety standards
  - The FDA must establish minimum standards based on scientific data for the safe production and harvesting of fruits and vegetables. Those standards must consider naturally occurring hazards, as well as those that may be introduced either unintentionally or intentionally, and must address soil amendments (materials added to the soil such as compost), hygiene, packaging, temperature controls, animals in the growing area and water. (Final regulation due about 2 years following enactment)
- Radiological hazards
  - For the first time, firms must explicitly consider radioactive contamination as part of their hazard analysis, under chemical safety. The FDA does not anticipate that this will be a hazard that requires continuous monitoring with a Geiger counter. Rather, as an example, a firm that uses spring water in its products should consider having the water tested regularly for the presence of dissolved radon, tritium and heavy metal contaminants.
- Authority to prevent intentional contamination
  - The FDA must issue regulations to protect against the intentional adulteration of food, including the establishment of mitigation strategies based on scientific data to prepare and protect the food supply chain at specific vulnerable points. (Final rule due 18 months following enactment) This is the first time language involving Food Defense has been incorporated into law.

=== Inspection and compliance ===
The FSMA recognizes that preventive control standards improve food safety only to the extent that producers and processors comply with them. FSMA provides the FDA with new authority to conduct inspections and ensure compliance.

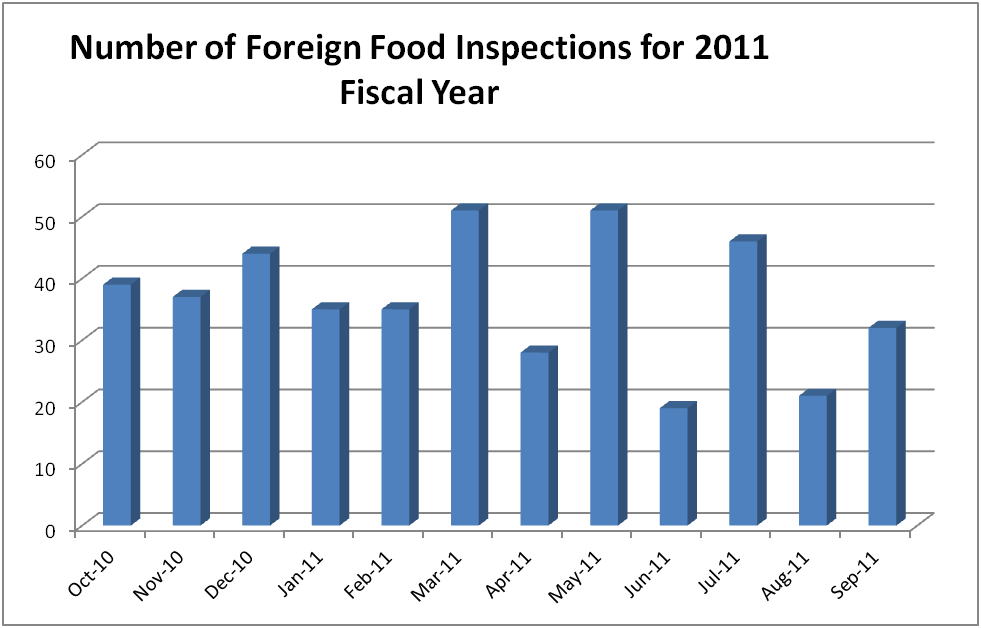
The 2011 fiscal year report on foreign food inspections by the FDA.

- Mandated inspection frequency
  - The FSMA establishes a mandated inspection frequency, based on risk, for food facilities and requires the frequency of inspection to increase immediately. All high-risk domestic facilities must be inspected within five years of enactment and no less than every three years thereafter. Within one year of enactment, the law directs the FDA to inspect at least 600 foreign facilities and double those inspections every year for the next five years. To accomplish this projected goal, the USFDA and other agencies in the United States will work in partnership or collaborate with foreign governing bodies for help, due to lack of resources to meet the demand.
- Records access
  - FDA will have access to records, including industry food safety plans and the records firms will be required to keep documenting implementation of their plans.
- Testing by accredited laboratories
  - The FSMA requires certain food testing to be carried out by accredited laboratories and directs the FDA to establish a program for laboratory accreditation to ensure that U.S. food testing laboratories meet high- quality standards. (Establishment of accreditation program due 2 years after enactment)
- Visual inspection
  - During an unannounced inspection by the FDA, a visual inspection will be conducted. During the inspection they will look at the building and equipment to see if there is any possibility of food contamination. The will probe into poor welds, condensation leaks especially over open product lines.
- Swabbing of environment
  - During their cursory walk, the agent will also look for any areas and niches that they feel may be a harborage point for bacteria. The agents can and will take anywhere form 150- 200 swabs depending on how big the facility is. The agent will also take raw material samples as well as finished product. It is advised that the company does not take companion samples because this can double the chances of a lab error, and does not look good if the FDA's samples come up negative and the facilities positive and vice versa.

=== Response to contaminants/violations ===
The bill gives the FDA the authority to recall food in the case of contamination or illness. In addition, it requires farms to track their food and implement plans to deal with recalls or outbreaks of disease. FDA officials will also be given access to food growers records in the case of an outbreak. The bill also requires food importers to verify that they meet US food safety standards. Small farms that sell locally or sell less than $500,000 a year are exempt from these new rules. New authorities include:

- Mandatory recall
  - The FSMA provides the FDA with authority to issue a mandatory recall when a company fails to voluntarily recall unsafe food after being asked to by the FDA.
- Expanded administrative detention
  - The FSMA provides the FDA with a more flexible standard for administratively detaining products that are potentially in violation of the law (administrative detention is the procedure the FDA uses to keep suspect food from being moved).
- Suspension of registration
  - The FDA can suspend registration of a facility if it determines that the food poses a SOMEWHAT reasonable probability of serious adverse health consequences or death. A facility that is under suspension is prohibited from distributing food. (Effective 6 months after enactment)
- Enhanced product tracing abilities
  - The FDA is directed to establish a system that will enhance its ability to track and trace both domestic and imported foods. In addition, FDA is directed to establish pilot projects to explore and evaluate methods to rapidly and effectively identify recipients of food to prevent or control a food borne illness outbreak. (Implementation of pilots due 9 months after enactment)
- Additional Record keeping for High Risk Foods
  - The FDA is directed to issue proposed rule making to establish record keeping requirements for facilities that manufacture, process, pack, or hold foods that the Secretary designates as high-risk foods. (Implementation due 2 years after enactment).

=== Additional information on imported goods ===
The FSMA gives the FDA authority to better ensure that imported products meet U.S. standards and are safe for U.S. consumers, with the vision that imported foods should be held to the same standards as domestic foods. These standards will be met by implementing the following components:

- Importer accountability
  - For the first time, importers have an explicit responsibility to verify that their foreign suppliers have adequate preventive controls in place to ensure that the food they produce is safe. (Final regulation and guidance due 1 year following enactment)
- Third Party Certification
  - The FSMA establishes a program through which qualified third parties can certify that foreign food facilities comply with U.S. food safety standards. This certification may be used to facilitate the entry of imports. (Establishment of a system for the FDA to recognize accreditation bodies is due 2 years after enactment)
- Certification for high risk foods
  - The FDA has the authority to require that high-risk imported foods be accompanied by a credible third party certification or other assurance of compliance as a condition of entry into the U.S.
- Voluntary qualified importer program
  - The FDA must establish a voluntary program for importers that provides for expedited review and entry of foods from participating importers. Eligibility is limited to, among other things, importers offering food from certified facilities. (Implementation due 18 months after enactment)
- Authority to deny entry
  - The FDA can refuse entry into the U.S. of food from a foreign facility if the FDA is denied access by the facility or the country in which the facility is located.

=== Enhanced partnerships ===
The FSMA builds a formal system of collaboration with other government agencies, both domestic and foreign. In doing so, the statute explicitly recognizes that all food safety agencies need to work together in an integrated way to achieve our public health goals. The following are examples of enhanced collaboration:

- State and local capacity building
  - The FDA must develop and implement strategies to leverage and enhance the food safety and defense capacities of State and local agencies. The FSMA provides the FDA with a new multi-year grant mechanism to facilitate investment in State capacity to more efficiently achieve national food safety goals.
- Foreign capacity building
  - The law directs the FDA to develop a comprehensive plan to expand the capacity of foreign governments and their industries. One component of the plan is to address training of foreign governments and food producers on U.S. food safety requirements.
- Reliance on inspections by other agencies
  - The FDA is explicitly authorized to rely on inspections of other Federal, State and local agencies to meet its increased inspection mandate for domestic facilities. The FSMA also allows the FDA to enter into inter-agency agreements to leverage resources with respect to the inspection of seafood facilities, both domestic and foreign, as well as seafood imports.

=== Employee protections ===
The FSMA also includes provisions that protect employees who try to prevent food safety problems. Section 402 of the FSMA prohibits employers engaged in the manufacture, processing, packing, transporting, distribution, reception, holding or importation of food from retaliating against employees who disclose violations of the Federal Food, Drug, and Cosmetic Act. This particular portion of the FSMA is administered by the U.S. Department of Labor.

== Implementation ==
With the Act in place, the FDA began the rulemaking process to codify how to enforce the new laws.

Effective June 12, 2011, many food companies became required to develop food safety plans based on an evaluation of hazards related to food manufactured, processed, packed or held in all registered facilities. Following a hazard analysis, firms were required to identify and implement preventive controls to significantly minimize or prevent the occurrence of such hazards. Examples of preventive controls include sanitation procedures for food contact surfaces; employee hygiene training; environmental monitoring to verify pathogen controls; a recall plan; supplier verification activities; and a food allergen control program.

Even after completion of the rulemaking process, it was estimated that time would be required for the FDA to become fully equipped to enforce the new laws. The agency estimated that it would require at least 1,000 more inspectors and $1.4 billion over the following five years, with uncertainty that Congress would appropriate such funds given the economic climate at the time, and calls for spending cuts.

=== Rules ===
In 2012, the FDA was sued by consumer groups the Center for Food Safety (CFS) and the Center for Environmental Health for its failure to meet deadlines. In settling the litigation, the agency agreed to deadlines in 2015 and 2016 for certain rules.

The first public comment period occurred in 2013, and the agency received tens of thousands of comments in that period. The FDA previously submitted their proposed regulations to the Office of Management and Budget (OMB) for review, and in that process the OMB weakened the regulations in a variety of ways.

=== FSMA progress report ===
The FDA has planned to make available to the general public and to Congress significant progress they have made towards implementing the FSMA. In March 2012, the FDA's Senior Advisor, Coordinated Outbreak Response and Evaluation Network, Sherri McGarry, on a blog reported the types of foods to be used in the pilot project on tracing products to prevent illnesses. The list includes tomatoes, frozen Kung Pao-style dishes, jarred peanut butter, and dry, packaged peanut/spice. Tomatoes both sliced and whole were chosen because of the significant number of outbreaks recorded; mirroring a multifaceted food supply chain. It was recommended by majority of the food industry associations as the number one food product to be used in the pilot program.

The Frozen Kung Pao-style dishes contain ingredients such as chicken, red pepper spice and peanut products which are foods that are involved in outbreaks, and for this reason were included in the pilot project. In addition, it is supplied to diverse food chain distribution channels which could involve imported and domestic products. To increase the intricacy of the pilot project, the jarred peanut butter and dry, packaged spice peanut were included. That summer, the pilot projects results were expected to be accomplished with hopes of developing a complete product tracing system with the information received.

=== Funding ===
The Safety Act was signed into law along with the Government Performance and Results Modernization Act of 2010. The cost for the first five years was projected to be $1.4 billion, without being fully funded at that time.

=== Food facility registration ===
On October 22, 2012, the updated food facility registration system by the US FDA was made available. This update required all facilities previously registered prior to October 1, 2012, to renew registration. Failure to do so became a prohibited act, leading to refusal of entry for foreign products and illegal trade for domestic facilities. Every 2 years in even numbered years, every registered facility would be required to renew its registration between October 1 and December 31. Registration would be accepted by fax, mail and electronics means on the FDA food facility registration website.

As of January 22, 2014, there were 195,518 food facilities registered with the FDA.

== Reaction and controversy ==
Large trade organizations joined public health advocates in supporting the bill, while groups aligned with individuals and small farms generally opposed it. However, after Senate adoption of Jon Tester's amendment, which allows for the possible exemption of producers that sell less than $500,000 a year, many large food companies objected, arguing that the exemption puts consumers at risk.

A year after enactment the agency had fallen behind on expected progress. It has yet to implement "a specific timetable for issuing" a process to create rule for science-based produce standards, has not completed rules for foreign supplier verification, and must still create a guidance that will help schools and childcare programs lessen allergy risks for school-age children.

A similar set of New Zealand rules, Food Bill 160–2, has been towards passage since 2010. The primary effects expected are to tie New Zealand to Codex Alimentarius and the World Trade Organization permanently, although those international agreements will be constantly adjusted. Despite its 366 pages, Food Bill 160-2 cannot directly resolve many threats to food safety, as there is no added Produce traceability nor methods to control Antibiotic resistance.

=== Alcoholic beverage facilities exemption ===
There has been criticism that the FDA's proposed rule would be prohibitively expensive on the practice of alcoholic beverage facilities selling spent grain to farmers for animal food. Under current law, alcoholic beverages, such as beer, wine, cider and spirits, are exempt from the FDA's normal oversight of food products. The FDA will open up the rule to comments again this summer and then revise the proposal, which is due to be finalized by August 2015.

The proposed rules regulate the "good manufacturing practice in manufacturing, processing, packing or holding of animal food" and "require that certain facilities establish and implement hazard analysis and risk-based preventive controls for food for animals", but animal food at alcoholic beverage facilities would not be exempt pursuant to section 116 of FSMA since "those spent grains are not alcoholic beverages themselves, and they are not in a prepackaged form that prevents any direct human contact with the food".

As of September 18, 2018, all brewers need to be in compliance with the Food Safety Modernization Act (FSMA).

Under the final rules the FDA is obligated to inspect every brewery in the USA over the next few years.

The FDA inspector will inspect and observe every level of the brewers operations.

They may and will review all record keeping files and are allowed to make copies and photographs for their records.

If the brewing facility fails the FDA inspection they will not only get fined but a stricter re-inspection will be required at a cost of over $200 per hour payable by the inspected brewer.

The USA brewing industry is legally obliged to provide a safe for consumption product and to ensure safety throughout the supply and manufacturing chain.

Brewing beer generally creates a much safer product than non-alcoholic beverages and foods, naturally protected from certain mycotoxins and bacteria, however it can still be contaminated by foreign bodies and chemicals at various stages within the manufacturing process.

== See also ==
- Codex Alimentarius
- Food Bill 160-2 of New Zealand
