= Public security =

Activity to ensure the safety and security of the public

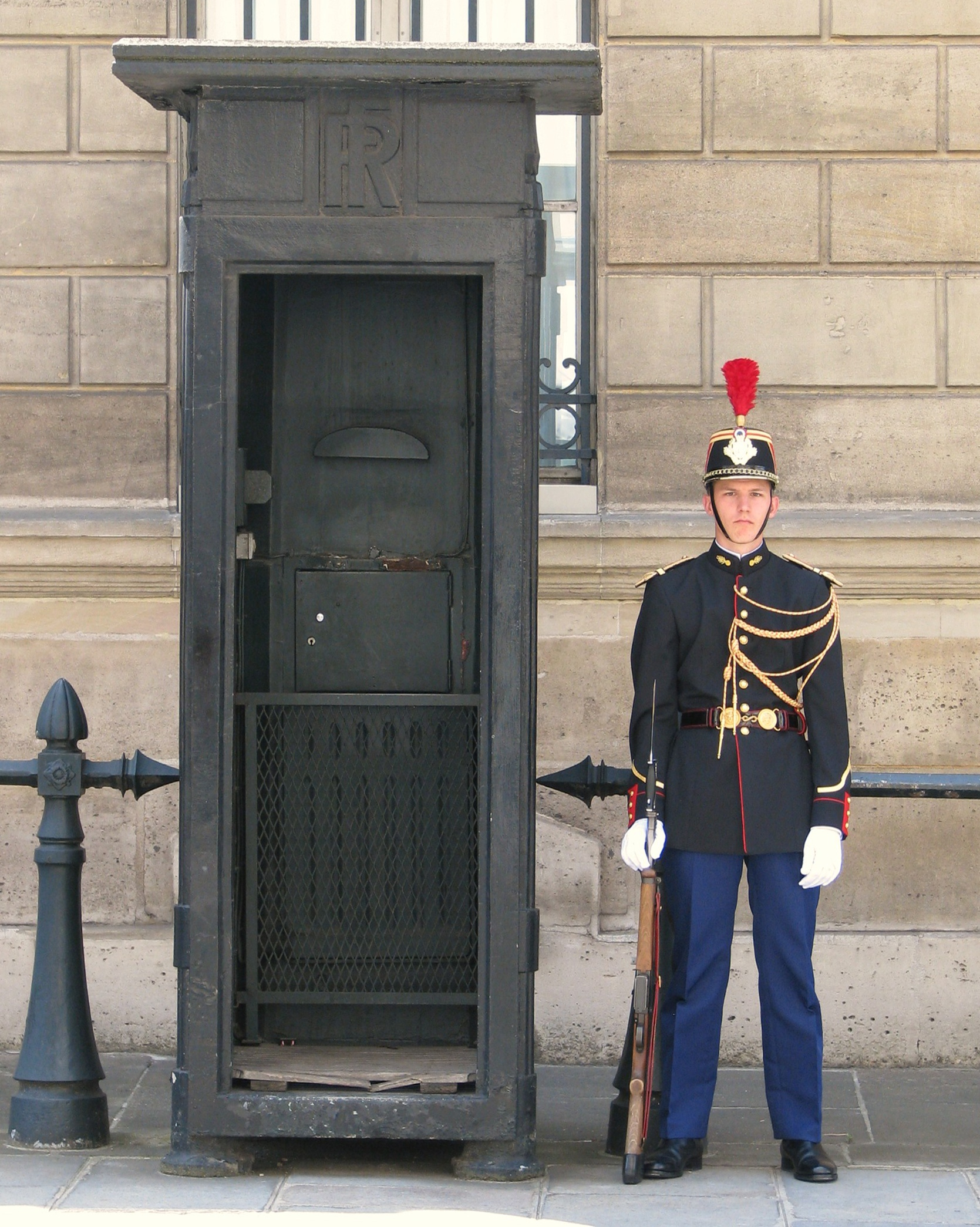
A member of the Republican Guard of the National Gendarmerie of France

Public security or public safety is the prevention of and protection from events that could endanger the safety and security of the public through significant injury or property damage. It is often conducted by a state government to ensure the protection of citizens, persons in their territory, organizations, and institutions against threats to their well-being, survival, and prosperity.

The public safety issues that a municipality, county, regional, or federal jurisdiction may handle include crimes (ranging from misdemeanors to felonies), structure fires, conflagrations, medical emergencies, mass-casualty incidents, disasters, terrorism, and other concerns.

Public safety organizations are organizations that conduct public safety. They generally consist of emergency services and first responders such as law enforcement, fire services, emergency medical services, security forces, and military forces. They are often operated by a government, though some private public safety organizations exist where possible.

== Framework ==
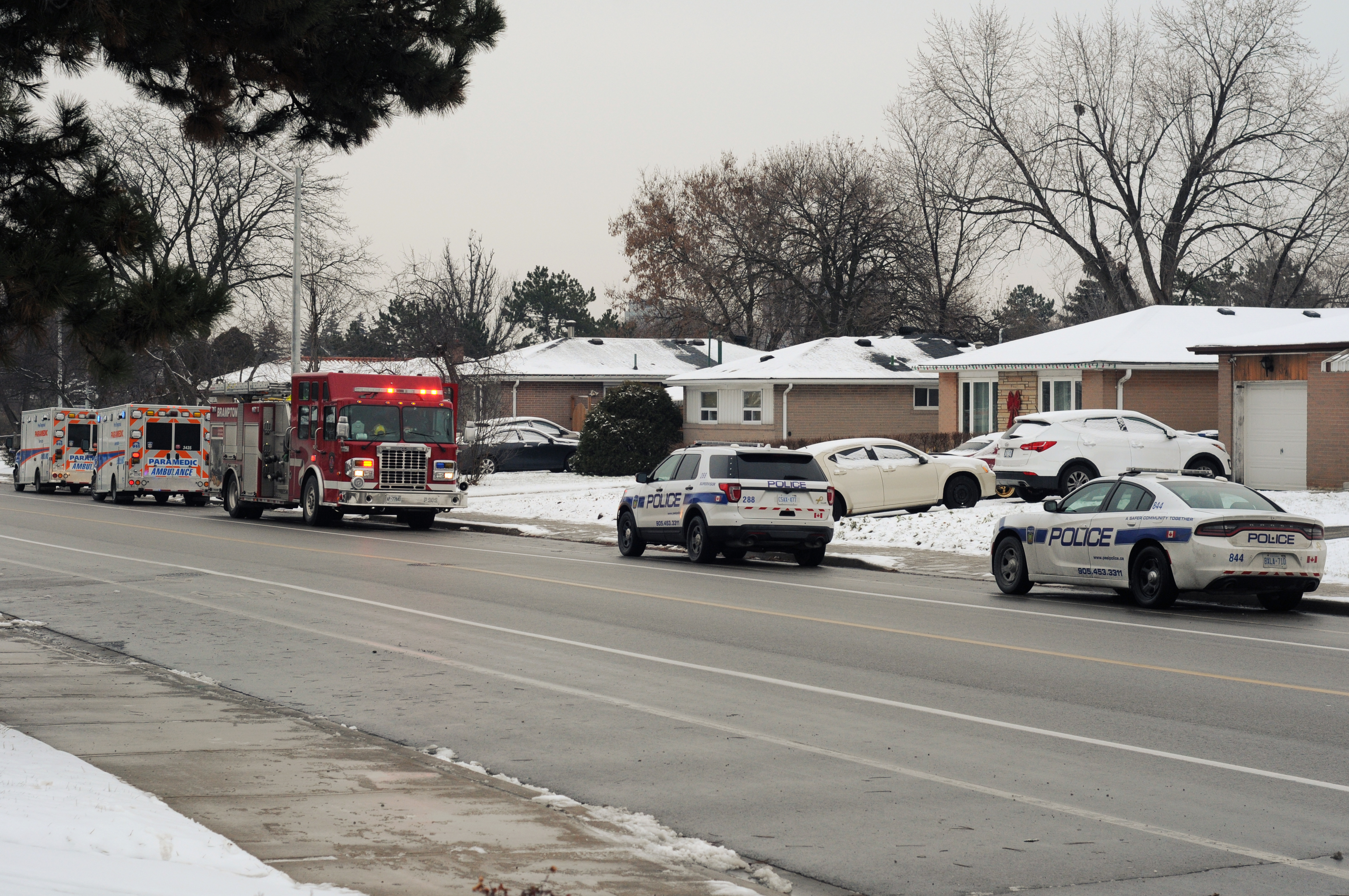
Emergency services at the scene of an incident in Brampton, Ontario, Canada

Organized crime and international terrorism are hardly deterred by geographical, linguistic, or financial barriers. The latter has largely contributed to public security becoming an important political and economic issue, nationally as well as internationally. Politics, public organizations and businesses closely collaborate to guarantee public security and maintain a stable environment for economic prosperity.

Although public security significantly contributes to the attractiveness of a location, the productivity of its people, and hence the overall success of an economy, the sector frequently suffers from low budgets, limited resources, and inadequate information systems. Large events, pandemics, severe accidents, environmental disasters, and terrorist attacks pose additional threats to public security and order.

The police, federal police and border authorities nonetheless need to warrant the security of the country as a fundamental prerequisite for the domestic political ability to act. The quality and scope of potential threats have changed significantly, and the tasks and general framework for the police, federal police and border authorities have changed accordingly.

== Public safety organizations ==
=== National ===
- Federal law enforcement agency
- Criminal investigation department
- Border patrol
- Gendarmerie
- Ministry or department of interior, justice, or public safety

=== Regional ===
- County police
- Sheriff or constable's office
- State trooper or provincial police

=== Local ===
- Police department or marshal
- Fire services
- Emergency medical services
- Local government
- Municipal public affairs office

== Sub-sectors ==
=== Law enforcement ===
- National or federal police
- Regional, state, and local police

=== Intelligence and information sharing ===
- Intelligence services
- Investigator services
- Secret services

=== Emergency ===
- Emergency medical services
- Fire service
- Police
- Park ranger
- Ocean Safety Lifeguard
- Search and rescue

=== Justice ===
- Courts
  - Judges
  - Juries
  - Lawyers and advocates
- Forensic
- Justice ministry
- Prison officers

=== Interior ===
- Border and port authorities
- Coast guard
- Customer services
- Home guard

=== Technique ===
- Crowd control
- Riot control

== Organizations ==
- By nation
  - In Australia, Australian Institute of Public Safety, Australian Federal Police
  - In Brazil, National Secretariat of Public Safety
  - In Canada, Public Safety Canada
  - In France, Committee of Public Safety
  - In Japan, National Public Safety Commission (Japan)
  - In South Korea, Ministry of the Interior and Safety (South Korea)
  - In United Kingdom, Department of Health, Social Services and Public Safety (Northern Ireland only)
  - In United States, United States Department of Homeland Security, Department of Public Safety
  - In Mongolia, State Emergency Commission (Mongolia)
  - Formerly Public Security (Czechoslovakia) with Czechoslovakia

== Types of security and dangers ==
- Airport security
- Association of Public-Safety Communications Officials-International
- Civil defense
- Civil defense sirens
- Common Alerting Protocol
- Consumer Bill of Rights
- Consumer Product Safety Commission
- Crime prevention through environmental design
- Emergency management
- Emergency telephone number
- Firefighting
- Neighborhood watch
- Food safety
- Guardian Angels
- Good safety practice
- National Highway Traffic Safety Administration
- Natural disaster
- No-go area
- Occupational safety and health
- Office of Emergency Management
- Personal protective equipment
- Police
- Public health
- Public safety network
- Risk
- Road traffic safety
- Safety engineering
- SafetyLit

== See also ==
- Closed-circuit television
- Crime statistics
- National security
- Internal security
- Justice
- Law enforcement
- Reclaim the Night
- Security agency
- Security of person
- Societal security
- Street light
- Take Back the Night
