= Research Quality Association =

The Research Quality Association (RQA) is a not for profit membership association. Formerly known a Quality Assurance Group UK (QAG UK) and the British Association of Research Quality Assurance (BARQA), the association changed its name to RQA in December 2012 in order to be able to act in a more global role.

== History ==
1977 The Association was founded. 1982 The first international conference was held in Rome. 1992 the first member's directory was produced. The first glossy member's newsletter was printed in 1993 and in 1998 it became Quasar. 1998 also saw the launch of the first BARQA website. 2001 The Association launched a new membership structure: Affiliate, Associate, Member, Fellow and Honorary Member grades. 2005 Saw the first Global QA Conference held with Society of Quality Assurance (SQA) and Japan Society of Quality Assurance (JSQA) in Orlando, Florida. 2012 India Regional Forum launched. 2013 The 1st European QA Conference with DGGF and SoFAQ was held in Bonn, Germany. 2015 US Regional Forum established. 2017 The Association celebrated its 40th birthday and 5th RQA/SQA/JSQA Global Conference held in Edinburgh.

== Mission statement ==
The association states that its vision is to drive quality and integrity through scientific research and development, through developing standards and facilitating knowledge sharing through: discussion, training, seminars, conferences, publications, partnership and cooperation.

RQA holds over 40 face to face courses yearly in the UK and Mainland Europe on a variety of topics, including all major GxP's.

== Committees ==
The association is made up of nine active committees:

- Good Clinical Practice Committee
- Good Laboratory Practice Committee
- Good Manufacturing Practice Committee
- Good Pharmacovigilance Practice Committee
- Animal and Veterinary Product Committee
- D.I.G.I.T. Committee
- Medical Devices Committee

== Involvement with other quality associations ==
RQA regulatory collaborates with its US counterpart SQA and attends SQA's annual meeting along with running a global conference every three years with both Society of Quality Assurance and Japan Society of Quality Assurance.

A European Conference is also held every three years with the French association SoFAq and the Germany association DGGF.

The association also has a memorandum of understanding with JSQA (Japan), SQA (USA), GQMA (Germany), SoFAq (France) and SARQA (Sweden).

== Regulatory involvement ==
RQA has links with DEFRA, in particular with a joint code of practice for veterinary activities. Members of RQA committees regulatory attend and contribute to stakeholder meetings run by the Medicines and Healthcare products Regulatory Agency (MHRA) in the UK and the European Medicines Agency (EMA) in Europe.

RQA attends the annual Research and Development Forum run by the NHS.

== Good Clinical Laboratory Practice (GCLP) Guideline ==
The GCLP guidelines was originally produced in 2002 by RQA committee members with the purpose of providing guidance on the quality system required in laboratories that undertake the analysis of samples from clinical trials. Since that time, this guidance has been widely adopted internationally by many organisations such as the World Health Organization, pharmaceutical companies, research institutions, non-governmental organisations (NGOs), hospitals, contract research organisations (CROs) and academia.
