= Cleaning validation =

Methodology assuring cleaning processes

Cleaning validation is the methodology used to assure that a cleaning process removes chemical and microbial residues of the active, inactive or detergent ingredients of the product manufactured in a piece of equipment, the cleaning aids utilized in the cleaning process and the microbial attributes. All residues are removed to predetermined levels to ensure the quality of the next product manufactured is not compromised by residues from the previous product and the quality of future products using the equipment, to prevent cross-contamination and as a good manufacturing practice requirement.

The U.S. Food and Drug Administration (FDA) has strict regulations about cleaning validation. For example, FDA requires firms to have written general procedures on how cleaning processes will be validated. Also, FDA expects the general validation procedures to address who is responsible for performing and approving the validation study, the acceptance criteria, and when revalidation will be required. FDA also require firms to conduct the validation studies in accordance with the protocols and to document the results of studies. The valuation of cleaning validation is also regulated strictly, which usually mainly covers the aspects of equipment design, cleaning process written, analytical methods and sampling. Each of these processes has their related strict rules and requirements. Acceptance criteria for cleaning validation protocols considers limits for chemicals and actives, limits for bio burden, visually cleanliness of surfaces, and the demonstration of consistency when executing the cleaning procedure. Regarding the establishment of limits, FDA does not intend to set acceptance specifications or methods for determining whether a cleaning process is validated. Current expectations for setting cleaning limits include the application of risk management principles and the consideration of Health Based Exposure Limits as the basis for setting cleaning limits for actives. Other limits that have been mentioned by industry include analytical detection levels such as 10 PPM, biological activity levels such as 1/1000 of the normal therapeutic dose and organoleptic levels.

== See also ==
- Process validation
