= Good agricultural practice =

Certification system for agriculture

Good agricultural practice (GAP) is a certification system for agriculture, specifying procedures (and attendant documentation) that must be implemented to create food for consumers or further processing that is safe and wholesome, using sustainable methods. While there are numerous competing definitions of what methods constitute good agricultural practice, there are several broadly accepted schemes that producers can adhere too.

== Motivation ==
Introduction of GAP is particularly desirable when there is chronic overuse and misuse of agricultural pesticides. Governments seek to reduce the use of pesticides by promoting alternative methods of pest management, while at the same time ensuring a steady production of safe and wholesome food.

== Organizations ==
=== Food and Agricultural Organization (FAO) of the United Nations GAP ===
The Food and Agricultural Organization of the United Nations (FAO) uses good agricultural practice as a collection of principles applying to on-farm production and post-production processes, resulting in safe and healthy food and non-food agricultural products, while taking into account economical, social and environmental sustainability.

GAPs require maintaining a common database on integrated production techniques for each of the major agro-ecological area (see ecoregion). They collect, analyze and disseminate information of good practices in relevant geographical contexts.

=== United States Department of Agriculture GAP/GHP Program ===
The United States Department of Agriculture Agricultural Marketing Service operates an audit/certification program to verify that farms use good agricultural practice or good handling practice. It is a voluntary program typically used by growers and packers to satisfy contractual requirements with retail and food service buyers. The program was implemented in 2002 after the New Jersey Department of Agriculture petitioned USDA-AMS to implement an audit-based program to verify conformance to the 1998 Food & Drug Administration publication entitled, "Guide to Minimize Microbial Food Safety Hazards for Fresh Fruits and Vegetables."

The program has been updated several times since 2002, and includes additional certification programs such as commodity specific audit programs for mushrooms, tomatoes, leafy greens, and cantaloupes. In 2009, USDA-AMS participated in the GAPs Harmonization Initiative which "harmonized" 14 of the major North American GAP audit standards, which in 2011 resulted in the release and implementation of the Produce GAPs Harmonized Food Safety Standard.

=== Korean National Agricultural Products Quality Management Institute GAP Program ===
Following the principles established by the United Nations and several of its members, Korea has established a GAP program that has been in effect since 2006.

== Recommendations ==
=== Soil ===
- Reducing erosion by wind and water through hedging and ditching.
- Application of fertilizers at appropriate moments and in adequate doses (i.e., when the plant needs the fertilizer), to avoid run-off
  - The use of sewage sludge is currently not allowed on GAP-certified farms of horticultural crops (though it is unclear whether this includes compost derived from sewage sludge and other human excreta derived fertilizers).
- Maintaining or restoring soil organic content, by manure application, use of grazing, crop rotation
- Reduce soil compaction issues (by avoiding using heavy mechanical devices)
- Maintain soil structure, by limiting heavy tillage practices
- In situ green manuring by growing pulse crops like cowpea, horse gram, sunn hemp etc.

=== Water ===
- Practice scheduled irrigation, with monitoring of plant needs, and soil water reserve status to avoid water loss by drainage
- Prevent soil salinization by limiting water input to needs, and recycling water whenever possible
- Avoid crops with high water requirements in a low availability region
- Avoid drainage and fertilizer run-off
- Maintain permanent soil covering, in particular in winter to avoid nitrogen run-off
- Manage carefully water table, by limiting heavy output of water
- Restore or maintain wetlands (see marshlands)
- Provide good water points for livestock
- Harvest water in situ by digging catch pits, crescent bunds across slope

=== Animal production, health and welfare ===
- Respect of animal well-being (freedom from hunger and thirst; freedom from discomfort; freedom from pain, injury or disease; freedom to express normal behavior; and freedom from fear and distress)
- Avoid nontherapeutic mutilations, surgical or invasive procedures, such as tail docking and debeaking;
- Avoid negative impacts on landscape, environment and life: contamination of land for grazing, food, water and air
- Check stocks and flows, maintain structure of systems
- Prevent chemical and medical residues from entering the food chain
- Minimize non-therapeutic use of antibiotics or hormones
- Avoid feeding animals with animal wastes or animal matter (reducing the risk of alien viral or transgenic genes, or prions such as mad cow disease),
- Minimize transport of live animals (by foot, rail or road) (reducing the risk of epidemics, e.g., foot and mouth disease)
- Prevent waste run-off (e.g. nitrate contamination of water tables from pigs), nutrient loss and greenhouse gas emissions (methane from cows)
- Prefer safety measures standards in manipulation of equipment
- Apply traceability processes on the whole production chain (breeding, feed, medical treatment...) for consumer security and feedback possibility in case of a food crisis (e.g., dioxin).

=== Healthcare and public health ===
- Quality assurance of the horticultural or agricultural production of medicinal plant

=== Smallholder productivity ===
Crop demand is expected to double as the world's population reaches 9.1 billion by 2050. Increasing the quantity and quality of food in response to growing demand will require increased agricultural production. Good agricultural practices, often combined with effective input use, are among the best ways to increase smallholder productivity. Many agribusinesses are building sustainable supply chains to increase production and improve quality.

== See also ==
- Best practice – Method or technique that has been generally accepted as superior
- Biosecurity – Preventive measures designed to reduce the risk of infectious disease transmission
- Electrical energy efficiency on United States farms
- EurepGAP – Farm assurance program
- Farm assurance – Certification for agricultural products
- GxP – Good practice guidelines and regulations
- ISO 9000 – Set of international standards for quality management systems
- List of sustainable agriculture topics – Overview of and topical guide to sustainable agriculture
- Urban agriculture – Farming in cities and urban areas
