= Good clinical laboratory practice =

Good clinical laboratory practice (GCLP) is a GxP guideline for laboratory samples from clinical studies.

Good clinical practice (GCP) does not define requirements for laboratories and good laboratory practice (GLP) focusses on pre-clinical analyses and not on human samples from clinical trials. The Research Quality Association (RQA) suggested in 2003 a guideline to close the gap. Later the World Health Organization and the British Medicines and Healthcare products Regulatory Agency issued their own versions of a GCLP guideline.

== Literature ==
- WHO Good Clinical Laboratory Practice (GCLP) ISBN 978-92-4-159785-2
- Stevens W. (2003) Good Clinical Laboratory Practice (GCLP): The need for a hybrid of Good Laboratory Practice and Good Clinical Practice guidelines/standards for medical testing laboratories conducting clinical trials in developing countries. Quality Assurance, 10: 83–89.
- Grant, Vanessa and Stiles, Tim, Research Quality Association (2003 and revised in 2012), Good Clinical Laboratory Practice ISBN 978-1-904610-21-2
