= GLOBALG.A.P. =

Farm assurance program

- Industry: Product certification
- Founded: 1997 (as EUREPGAP)
- Headquarters: Cologne, Germany
- Key people: Dr. Elme Coetzer-Boersma (Managing Director), Markus Philipp (Managing Director)
- Brands: GGN label
- Owner: FoodPLUS GmbH
- Website: www.globalgap.org

GLOBALG.A.P. is a brand of farm assurance standards based on Good Agricultural Practice, owned by FoodPLUS GmbH. First created in the late 1990s by several European supermarket chains and their suppliers under the name EUREPGAP, standards were developed using the Hazard Analysis and Critical Control Points (HACCP) guidelines published by the United Nations Food and Agriculture Organization, and is governed according to the ISO/IEC 17065 for product certification schemes.

GLOBALG.A.P. standards are voluntary and developed in collaboration with sector stakeholders – including producers, certification bodies, and retailers – and cover production processes in agriculture, floriculture, aquaculture, animal feed manufacturing, and chain of custody.

The certification system is based on audits by accredited and independent third party certification bodies. Each registered producer is assigned a unique 13-digit GLOBALG.A.P. Number (GGN), which can be searched in the public GLOBALG.A.P. database.

In February 2009 GLOBALG.A.P. launched 'ChinaGAP' following successful completion of the benchmarking of ChinaGAP against the GLOBALG.A.P. Good Agricultural Practice reference code.

In 2023, there were more than 190,000 producers under GLOBALG.A.P. certification across 137 countries. Certified production processes for plants account for more than 4.5 million hectares annually. Aquaculture products from certified production account for over 2.6 million tons in the market each year.

== Standards and certification ==
GLOBALG.A.P. standards are organized in three categories: entry-level assurance for producers in emerging markets, internationally recognized certification, and add-on assessments which expand the scope of certification on specific topics.

Standards are audited/assessed each year by an independent and accredited third-party certification or verification body. The certification status of each producer can be verified in real-time via the public GLOBALG.A.P. database.

The consistent implementation and delivery of standards is overseen by the GLOBALG.A.P. Integrity Program, which monitors and assesses the key aspects of the third-party certification process. This covers certification body training and approval, certification integrity, complaint management, and customer support.

=== Entry-level assurance ===
The Primary Farm Assurance (PFA) program – formerly “localg.a.p.” – is a stepwise, entry-level assessment of good agricultural practices designed for smallholder fruit and vegetable producers in emerging markets. For flower and ornamental producers, the entry-level Impact-Driven Approach to Sustainability (IDA) module supports the collection and analysis of farm data. Both assessments result in a letter of conformance that can help achieve local, national, and regional market access.

=== Internationally recognized certification ===
GLOBALG.A.P. operates a range of internationally recognized standards for primary production and the supply chain. The flagship GLOBALG.A.P.’s standard is Integrated Farm Assurance (IFA), which is a frequently requested trading requirement by retailers and buyers worldwide.

IFA is applicable to the production processes of fruit and vegetables, flowers and ornamentals, hops, combinable crops, plant propagation material, tea, and aquaculture (finfish/crustaceans/molluscs/seaweed).

Other standards include the Compound Feed Manufacturing (CFM) standard for aquaculture and livestock feed mills, the Produce Handling Assurance (PHA) standard aimed at postharvest pre-processing activities, and the GLOBALG.A.P. Chain of Custody standard for supply chain stakeholders trading products originating from GLOBALG.A.P. certified production processes.

=== Add-on assessments ===
Expanding the scope of certification, GLOBALG.A.P. add-ons include farm-level audits and assessments such as for workers’ health, safety, and welfare (GLOBALG.A.P. Risk Assessment on Social Practice, GRASP), water stewardship (Sustainable Program for Irrigation and Groundwater Use, SPRING) and biodiversity management (BioDiversity).

Other add-ons are aimed at specific topics, such as demonstrating compliance with the US Food Safety Modernization Act Produce Safety Rule (FSMA PSR), implementing a biosecurity plan against the TR4 disease in banana/plantain production, and guiding optimization efforts through farm data comparison and analysis.

=== Standard setting ===
GLOBALG.A.P. standards are created in collaboration with supply chain stakeholders to reflect both market needs and the daily realities of producers on the ground. Building on a scientific baseline provided by GLOBALG.A.P. technical experts, draft standards undergo public consultation to capture feedback from across the relevant sector.

== Industry recognition ==
GLOBALG.A.P. standards are recognized by a range of sector initiatives, NGOs, national governments, and trade associations, including:

- Global Food Safety Initiative (GFSI)
- Global Sustainable Seafood Initiative (GSSI)
- Floriculture Sustainability Initiative (FSI)
- Sustainability Initiative Fruit and Vegetables (SIFAV)
- International Fresh Produce Association (IFPA)
- World Wildlife Fund (WWF) Spain
- US Food and Drug Administration (FDA)

== History ==
=== First standards and accreditation ===
In 1997, "EUREPGAP" (Euro-Retailer Produce Work Group Good Agricultural Practice) was formed by European retailers to proactively address consumer concerns on food safety. They decided to harmonize their standards by developing an independent certification system that also covered topics such as workers and the environment.

The first scheme for fruit and vegetables was presented and trialed during 2000, with EUREPGAP receiving ISO 65 accreditation and issuing the first certificates in 2001. Following the success of the standard, retailers requested a version for flowers and ornamentals, which launched in 2003.

With NGO support, the first aquaculture standard was launched in 2004. One year later, the livestock standard was introduced, marking the foundation of what is now the flagship "Integrated Farm Assurance (IFA)" scheme. A standard for feed manufacturing was published in 2005 as the first solution to cover both aquaculture and livestock feed mills.

In 2007, to reflect the global reach of the EUREPGAP standards, a name change to GLOBALG.A.P. was completed.

=== Capacity building and integrity programs ===
In 2008, the GLOBALG.A.P. Integrity Program was created as the first of its kind in food certification, monitoring the delivery and implementation of GLOBALG.A.P. standards worldwide. A new standard for plant propagation material was also published.

To boost capacity-building efforts, GLOBALG.A.P. launched the first "TOUR stops" in 2010, aimed at connecting with stakeholders on the ground. Events were held across five continents, marked by the launch of the "localg.a.p." assurance program for smallholders. A network of licensed agricultural experts was then founded in 2011 under the name "Farm Assurers" (now "Registered Trainers"), facilitating training and consultation for producers preparing for certification.

In 2011, version 4 of the Integrated Farm Assurance standard was launched and GLOBALG.A.P. North America – a subsidiary of FoodPLUS GmbH – was established in the USA to further the growth of GLOBALG.A.P. standards in the region.

=== Launch of the GGN label initiative ===
The GLOBALG.A.P. Academy, providing training and support for a range of stakeholder groups, was established in 2012.

GLOBALG.A.P., the International Trade Centre (the joint agency of the World Trade Organization and the United Nations), and SAI Platform signed the "Declaration of Abu Dhabi" in 2014, establishing eight commitments to new approaches that make it easier for farmers around the world to adopt safe and responsible production practices.

In 2016, FoodPLUS GmbH launched the GGN label as the first consumer communication channel, offering on-product assurance based on GLOBALG.A.P. certification. Initially for products from certified aquaculture farms, the GGN label established an online portal that consumers can use to trace the products they buy.

The GGN label expanded to cover flower and ornamental products in 2017.

=== Foundations for future development ===
The 200,000th producer achieved GLOBALG.A.P. certification in 2018. At the GLOBALG.A.P. SUMMIT event in Peru, a call to action was signed with the World Banana Forum to fight the spread of the destructive TR4 disease. This resulted in the creation of a dedicated GLOBALG.A.P. solution for banana and plantain producers.

In 2019, the GLOBALG.A.P. Advisory Board was expanded to include representation from Latin America and the Asia-Pacific regions. Due to the COVID-19 pandemic in 2020, GLOBALG.A.P. conducted a virtual “World Consultation Tour” on the development of the new version 6 of the IFA standard. New procedures were also developed to counter travel restrictions, such as the “Remote Procedure” aimed at remote audits.

The GGN label was relaunched in 2021 as cross-category, uniting the individual labels for agriculture, aquaculture, and floriculture under a single, new-look logo.

2022 saw the publication of IFA version 6, marking a major shift towards smarter, streamlined, and data-driven standards.

== Accreditation ==
For certification bodies to gain approval in the GLOBALG.A.P. system, they must meet international standards through formal accreditation. This requirement is the ISO/IEC 17065 – an internationally recognized standard defining requirements for organizations certifying products, processes, or services.

== GGN label ==
The GGN label is a cross-category consumer label that stands for "certified, responsible farming and transparency". Owned by FoodPLUS GmbH, the label aims to offer relevant assurance and orientation throughout retail stores.

Product labels or packaging feature a unique 13-digit tracking code (a GGN or CoC Number) that can be used to trace products back to the farm on the GGN label portal website.

The label requirements are based on GLOBALG.A.P. standards for the relevant scope: agriculture, aquaculture, and floriculture. After fulfilling the requirements and obtaining a license, the GGN label can be applied to a range of products including fresh, potted, and cut/mixed/frozen fruit and vegetables; fresh, frozen, and packed farmed seafood; and cut flowers, flower bulbs, and non-edible potted plants.

As of December 2023, there were GGN label license holders in 31 countries, with products available in 40 countries worldwide. There were over 2,000 individual products in stores featuring the GGN label on packaging.

The label has been awarded the highest classification of “top quality label” by independent Dutch sustainability foundation Milieu Centraal.

== Criticism ==
GLOBALG.A.P. has been criticized for not preventing illegal water use, substantial gaps in the environmental standards, and not preventing labor exploitation.

== See also ==
- Agriculture ministry
- Global Food Safety Initiative (GFSI)
- Good Agricultural Practices
