= State Institute for Drug Control =

Czech government agency

- Státní ústav pro kontrolu léčiv

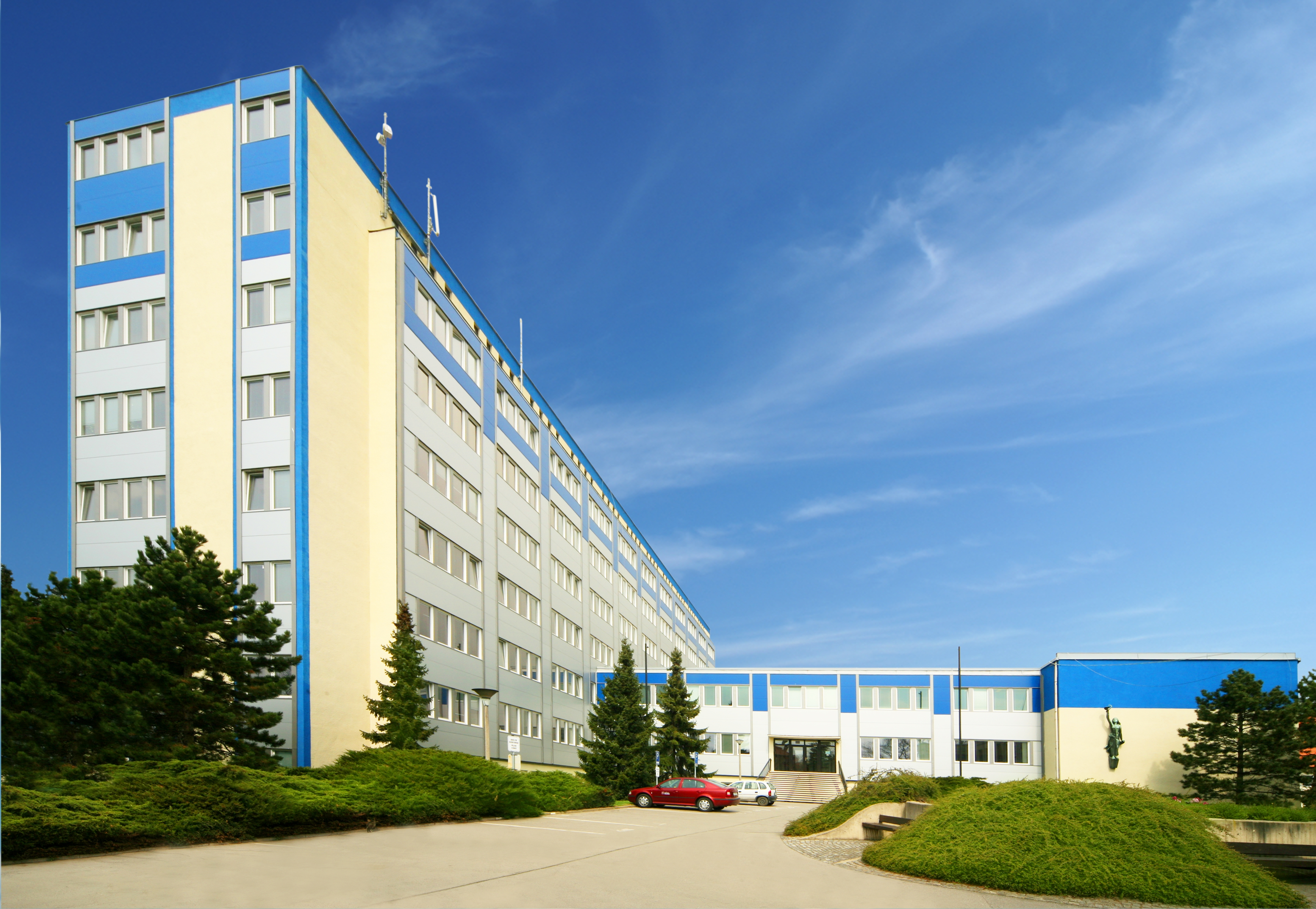
- SÚKL office in Prague

Agency overview
- Formed: 1952
- Jurisdiction: Government of the Czech Republic
- Headquarters: Prague 10, Czech Republic; 50°4′33.6″N 14°28′22.53″E
- Website: www.sukl.eu

The State Institute for Drug Control (Czech: Státní ústav pro kontrolu léčiv) is a Czech government agency responsible for regulation of the safe production of pharmaceuticals in the country, clinical evaluation of medicines and for monitoring the advertising and marketing of both medicines and medical devices. Its powers stem from the Act on Public Health Insurance (Act No. 48/1997 Coll.).

Only part of its operating costs are directly funded. It is largely self-financing through charges for its services.

The SÚKL sets maximum ex-factory prices for reimbursement based on 195 reference groups of therapeutically interchangeable products of similar clinical efficacy. More than 20% of the health budget is spent on medication and medical devices. From January 2019 it took responsibility for regulating the reimbursement of consumer medical devices prescribed as part of outpatient care.

It allocates codes and names of medications for use in the electronic prescribing system.

It has been criticised by KOPAC, the Patient Association for Cannabis Treatment, for failing to ensure a supply of Czech medical cannabis so that patients have to pay inflated prices for imported supplies.
