= Good documentation practice =

Document standards in pharmaceutical and medical device industry

Good documentation practice (recommended to abbreviate as GDocP to distinguish from "good distribution practice" also abbreviated GDP) is a term in the pharmaceutical and medical device industries to describe standards by which documents are created and maintained. While some GDocP standards are codified by various competent authorities, others are not but are considered cGMP (with emphasis on the "c", or "current"). Some competent authorities release or adopt guidelines, and they may include non-codified GDocP expectations. While not law, authorities will inspect against these guidelines and cGMP expectations in addition to the legal requirements and make comments or observations if departures are seen. In the past years, the application of GDocP is also expanding to cosmetic industry, excipient and ingredient manufacturers.

== GDocP standards ==
=== Documentation creation ===
- Contemporaneous with the event they describe
- Not handwritten (except for handwritten entries thereon)
- When electronically produced, the documentation must be checked for accuracy
- Free from errors
- For some types of data, it is recommended that records are in a format that permits trend evaluation

=== Document approval ===
- Approved, signed, and dated by appropriate authorized personnel

=== Handwritten entries ===
- Adequate space is provided for expected handwritten entries
- Handwritten entries are in indelible ink
- Errors (i.e. misspelling, illegible entries, etc.) are corrected and reason is documented
- Critical entries must be independently checked (SPV, or second person verified)
- No spaces for handwritten entries are left blank – if unused, they are crossed out or "N/A" (or similar text) entered
- Ditto marks or continuation lines are not acceptable
- Correction fluid are not allowed to be used in correcting errors
- A stamp in lieu of a handwritten signature is not acceptable

=== Copies of documents ===
- Clear, legible
- Errors are not introduced

=== Document maintenance ===
- Regularly reviewed and kept current
- Retained and available for appropriate duration
- Electronic document management systems are validated
- Electronic records are backed up

=== Document modification ===
- Handwritten modifications are signed and dated
- Altered text is not obscured (e.g., no correction fluid)
- Where appropriate, the reason for alteration must be noted
- Controls exist to prevent the inadvertent use of superseded documents
- Electronic versions can only be modified by authorized personnel
- A history (audit trail) must be maintained of changes and deletions to electronic versions
- Supporting documents can be added to the original document as an attachment for clarification or recording data. Attachments should be referenced at least once within the original document. Ideally, each page of the attachment is clearly identified (i.e. labeled as "Attachment X", "Page X of X", signed and dated by person who attached it, etc.)

== GDocP interpretation ==
From the regulatory guidance above, additional expectations or allowances can be inferred by extension. Among these are:

- Prohibition against removing pages – the removal of a page would obscure the data that were present, so this is not permissible.
- Page numbering – the addition of page numbers, particularly in "Page x of y" format, allows a reviewer to ensure that there are no missing pages.
- Stamped signatures in Asia – the culture of certain Asian countries, and the controls they employ, are such that their use of a stamp in lieu of handwritten signatures has been accepted.
- Date and time formats – dates may be written in a variety of formats that can be confusing if read by personnel with a different cultural background. In the context where different cultures interact, a date such as "07-05-10" can have numerous different meanings and therefore, by GDocP standards above, violates the requirement for being clear.
- Transcription – a transcription of data, where the original document is not retained, effectively obscures the original data and would be prohibited. Transcription may be helpful where the original is of poor quality writing or is physically damaged, but it should be clearly marked as a transcription and the original retained nevertheless.
- Scrap paper, Post-it notes – intentionally recording raw data on non-official records is a set-up for transcription and is therefore prohibited.
- Avoiding asterisks as part of the notation of a hand-change – where insufficient white space permits a fully notated hand change, a common practice is to use an asterisk (or other mark) near the correction, and elsewhere record the same mark and the notation. The risk is that additional changes are made by another person who uses the same mark, and now the notation can be interpreted to apply to all changes with the mark. Some will therefore advise against the use of the asterisk. Others will accept it, if the notation clearly includes the number of changes that it applies to, such as, "* Three entries changed above due to entry errors. KAM 13-Jan-2011". There are no known instances of an agency rejecting such a notation.

== Enforcement ==
The competent authorities are empowered to inspect establishments to enforce the law and the interpretations of the law (e.g., the content of guidance documents and the cGMPs).

Departures from GDocP that involved the regulator have included: documentation not contemporaneous, use of ditto marks, signature stamps., obscured original data, Use of pencil, inaccurate records, and not dating changes.

== See also ==
- Best practice
- Good manufacturing practice
- Site Master File
