= Good automated manufacturing practice =

Pharmaceutical manufacturing guidelines

GAMP is both a technical subcommittee of the International Society for Pharmaceutical Engineering (ISPE ) and a set of guidelines for manufacturers and users of automated systems in the pharmaceutical industry. More specifically, the ISPE's guide The Good Automated Manufacturing Practice (GAMP) Guide for Validation of Automated Systems in Pharmaceutical Manufacture describes a set of principles and procedures that help ensure that pharmaceutical products have the required quality. One of the core principles of GAMP is that quality cannot be tested into a batch of product but must be built into each stage of the manufacturing process. As a result, GAMP covers all aspects of production; from the raw materials, facility and equipment to the training and hygiene of staff. Standard operating procedures (SOPs) are essential for processes that can affect the quality of the finished product.

A group of pharmaceutical professionals have banded together to create the GAMP Forum, which is now a technical sub-committee, known as the GAMP COP (community of practice) of the International Society for Pharmaceutical Engineering (ISPE). The goal of the community is to promote the understanding of the regulation and use of automated systems within the pharmaceutical industry. The GAMP COP organizes discussion forums for its members. ISPE organizes GAMP-related training courses and educational seminars. Several local GAMP COPs, such as GAMP Americas, GAMP Nordic, GAMP DACH (Germany, Austria, Switzerland), GAMP Francophone, GAMP Italiano, GAMP Benelux (Belgium, Netherlands, Luxembourg) and GAMP Japan bring the GAMP community closer to its members in collaboration with ISPE's local affiliates in these regions.

== GAMP guidance ==
ISPE has published a series of good practice guides for the industry on several topics involved in drug manufacturing. The most well-known is The Good Automated Manufacturing Practice (GAMP) Guide for Validation of Automated Systems in Pharmaceutical Manufacture. The second edition (GAMP5) was released in July 2022.

Other publications in the GAMP series include:

- GAMP Good Practice Guide: A Risk-Based Approach to Compliant GxP Computerized Systems
- GAMP Good Practice Guide: Calibration Management
- GAMP Good Practice Guide: Electronic Data Archiving
- GAMP Good Practice Guide: Global Information Systems Control and Compliance
- GAMP Good Practice Guide: IT Infrastructure Control and Compliance
- GAMP Good Practice Guide: Testing of GxP Systems
- GAMP Good Practice Guide: Validation of Laboratory Computerized Systems
- GAMP Good Practice Guide: Validation of Process Control Systems

== History ==
GAMP itself was founded in 1991 in the United Kingdom to deal with the evolving U.S. Food and Drug Administration expectations for good manufacturing practice (GMP) compliance of manufacturing and related systems. GAMP published its first guidance in 1994. Soon afterwards the organization entered into a partnership with ISPE, formally becoming part of ISPE in 2000. GAMP has enjoyed the support of numerous regulatory authorities over the years spanning the United States, Europe, and Japan and is now a recognised good practice worldwide.

== See also ==
- Good manufacturing practice covering other industries
- Corrective and preventive action (CAPA)
- Pharmaceutical Inspection Convention and Pharmaceutical Inspection Co-operation Scheme
- Validation (drug manufacture)
- International Conference on Harmonisation of Technical Requirements for Registration of Pharmaceuticals for Human Use (ICH)
- European Medicines Agency (EMA)
- European Federation of Pharmaceutical Industries and Associations (EFPIA)
- Japan Pharmaceutical Manufacturers Association (JPMA)
- Pharmaceutical Research and Manufacturers of America (PhRMA)
