= Thermal cooking =

Cooking method

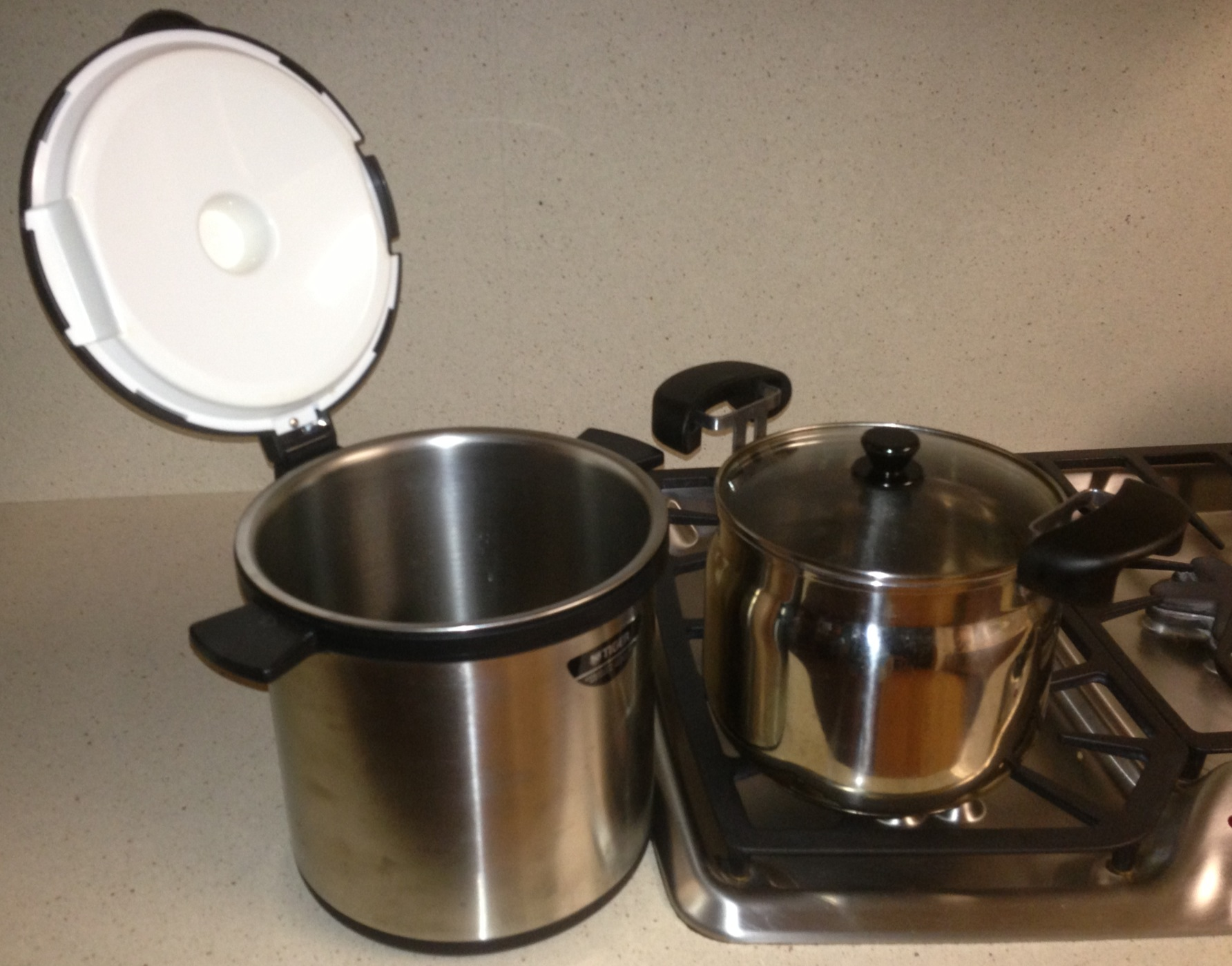
A vacuum flask cooker with the inner pot on a kitchen stove

A thermal cooker, or a vacuum flask cooker, is a cooking device that uses thermal insulation to retain heat and cook food without the continuous use of fuel or other heat source. It is a modern implementation of a haybox, which uses hay or straw to insulate a cooking pot.

== History ==
The earliest known thermal cooker dates from the Medieval period in Europe. After heating over a fire, a hot, earthenware pot containing food was placed in another, larger pot, box or hole in the ground, insulated by hay, moss, dry leaves or other material, and covered. The heat conserved within would slowly cook the food inside, saving fuel and work. An example of this type of cooker was found in Wales by a Monmouth Archaeological Society excavation.

Medieval instructions for cooking without fire taken from an Anglo-Norman manuscript in the British Library:

Take a small earthenware pot, with an earthenware lid which must be as wide as the pot, then take another pot of the same earthenware, with a lid like that of the first; this pot is to be deeper than the first by five fingers, and wider in circumference by three; then take pork and hens and cut into fair-sized pieces, and take fine spices and add them, and salt; take the small pot with the meat in it and place it upright in the large pot, cover it with the lid and stop it with moist clayey earth, so that nothing may escape, then take unslaked lime, and fill the larger pot with water, ensuring that no water enters the smaller pot; let it stand for the time it takes to walk between five and seven leagues and then open your pots, and you will found your food indeed cooked.

A league is about three miles (five km), so the length of cooking time is approximately five to seven hours.

== Modern thermal cookers ==
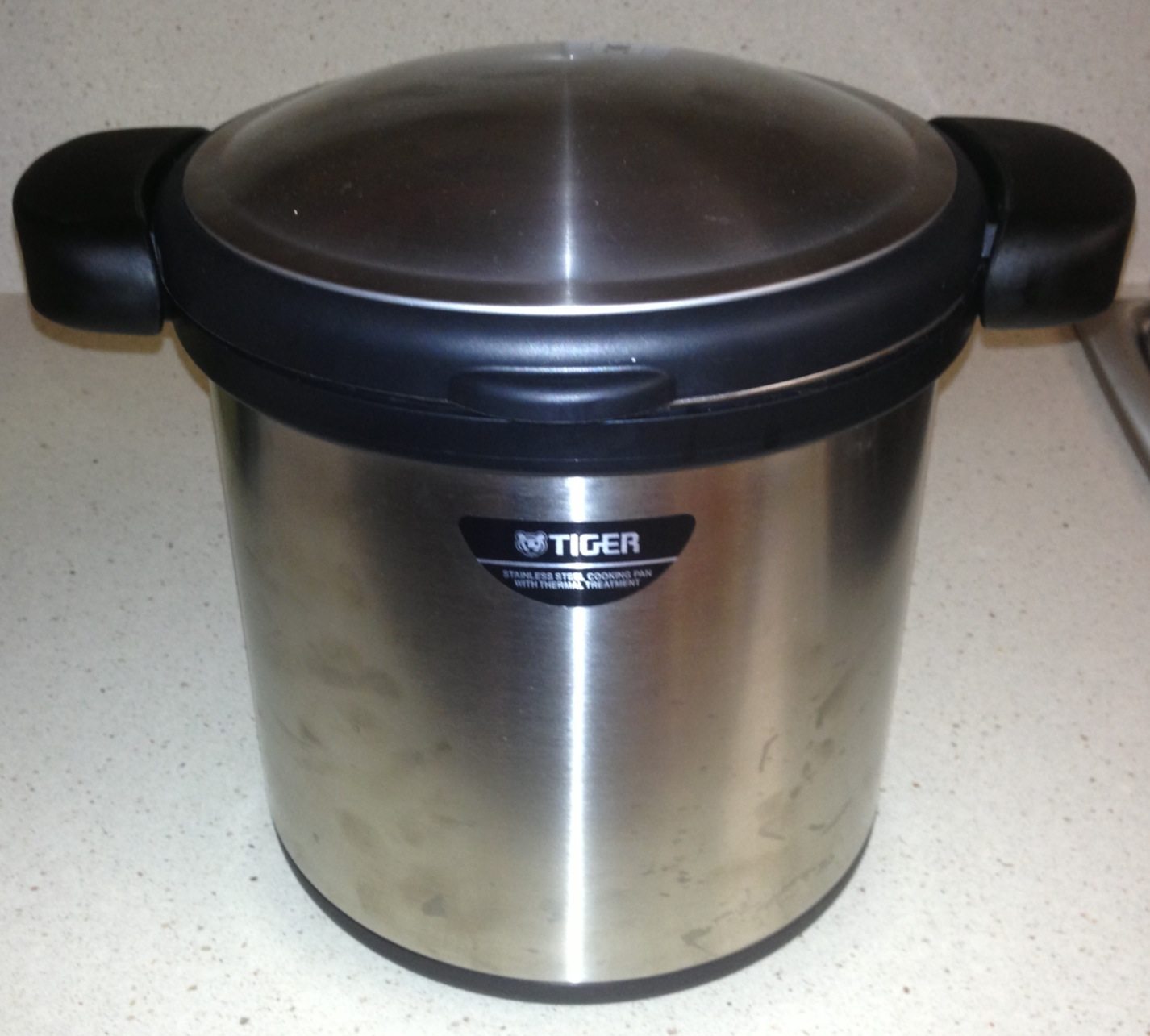
A vacuum flask cooker with the pot inside

In the mid-1990s steel thermal cookers were developed in Asia, consisting of two stainless steel pots, one within the other. The inner pot is used to bring the food to the boil and the insulated outer pot is used as the container to retain heat and continue the cooking process. Some use insulation material between the outer pot walls, while others use a vacuum.

A vacuum cooker (Chinese: 燜燒鍋) is a stainless steel vacuum flask. The flasks come in various sizes ranging from 20 to 40 centimetres (8 to 16 in) in diameter and 25 centimetres (10 in) tall. A removable pot, with handle and lid, fits inside the vacuum flask. The pot and contents are heated to cooking temperature, and then sealed in the flask. The flask simply reduces heat loss to a minimum, so that the food remains at cooking temperature for a long time, and cooks without continued heating. Note that the food is not cooked in a vacuum. It is cooked inside a vacuum flask. The hollow evacuated wall of the cooker thermally insulates its contents from the environment, so they remain hot for several hours.

Thermal cookers appeal to Cantonese cooks because many Cantonese dishes require prolonged braising or simmering. When these cookers were first introduced in the US, they sold very quickly in the larger Asian supermarkets. The slow cooker is used for a similar purpose; but instead of minimising heat loss, sufficient heat is applied to the non-insulated slow cooker to maintain a steady temperature somewhat below the boiling point of water. A slow cooker allows any desired cooking time; the more energy-efficient vacuum flask must cook within the time taken for the food to cool below cooking temperature.

Thermal cookers with two inner pots allow two items to be cooked at the same time, such as curry and rice. All thermal cookers are capable of cooking many dishes from soups to puddings. Cakes and bread can also be cooked by partly submerging the cake/bread tin in boiling water.

== Method ==
The pot is filled with food and water and heated to cooking temperature outside of the flask on a stove, usually to boiling. It is then sealed inside the vacuum flask for several hours. The flask minimises heat loss, keeping the food hot enough to continue cooking and avoid bacterial growth for many hours.

== Advantages ==
- Long cooking means more tender meat and allows cooking of beans, lentils, and brown rice.
- Minimizes fuel, energy use, CO_{2} emissions
- Saves water, less evaporation.
- Saves food — no burning, no cleanup.
- Keeps flavour and nutrients in.
- Convenient — cooks while you are at work or sleeping or travelling.
- Can take travelling or to picnics.
- Reduces smoke, odor, humidity, grease buildup in kitchen.
- Easy cleanup.
- Safer — no power cord, the outside is not hot, spill-proof, reduces injuries.
- Reduces toxic fumes, which means less respiratory problems and other diseases, particularly in children.

== Precautions ==
If a large part of the cooking time is spent at temperatures lower than 60 °C (as when the contents of the cooker are slowly cooling over a long period), a danger of food poisoning due to toxins produced by multiplying bacteria arises. It is essential to heat food sufficiently at the outset of vacuum cooking; 60 °C throughout the dish for 10 minutes is sufficient to kill most pathogens of interest, effectively pasteurizing the dish. Some foods, such as kidney beans, fava beans, and many other varieties of beans contain a toxin, phytohaemagglutinin, that requires boiling at 100 °C for at least 10 minutes to break down to safe levels. The best practice is to bring briefly to a rolling boil then put the pot in the flask. This keeps it hottest longest. With big chunks of food, boil a little longer before putting into the flask.

== Variants ==
Variants of thermal cooking, though a better name would be "heat retention" cooking:

- Wonderbag is an insulated bag to put around existing pots.
- Haybox cooking uses hay or sawdust to provide the insulation around the pot.
  - A variant of the haybox that uses wool as the insulator

A different kind of vacuum cooker is used in the candy manufacturing industry to cook candies at low air pressures.

Sous-vide cooking is cooking at temperatures under boiling, usually in a plastic bag.

== See also ==
- Low-temperature cooking
- Sous-vide
