= Roasting =

Cooking method using dry air heat

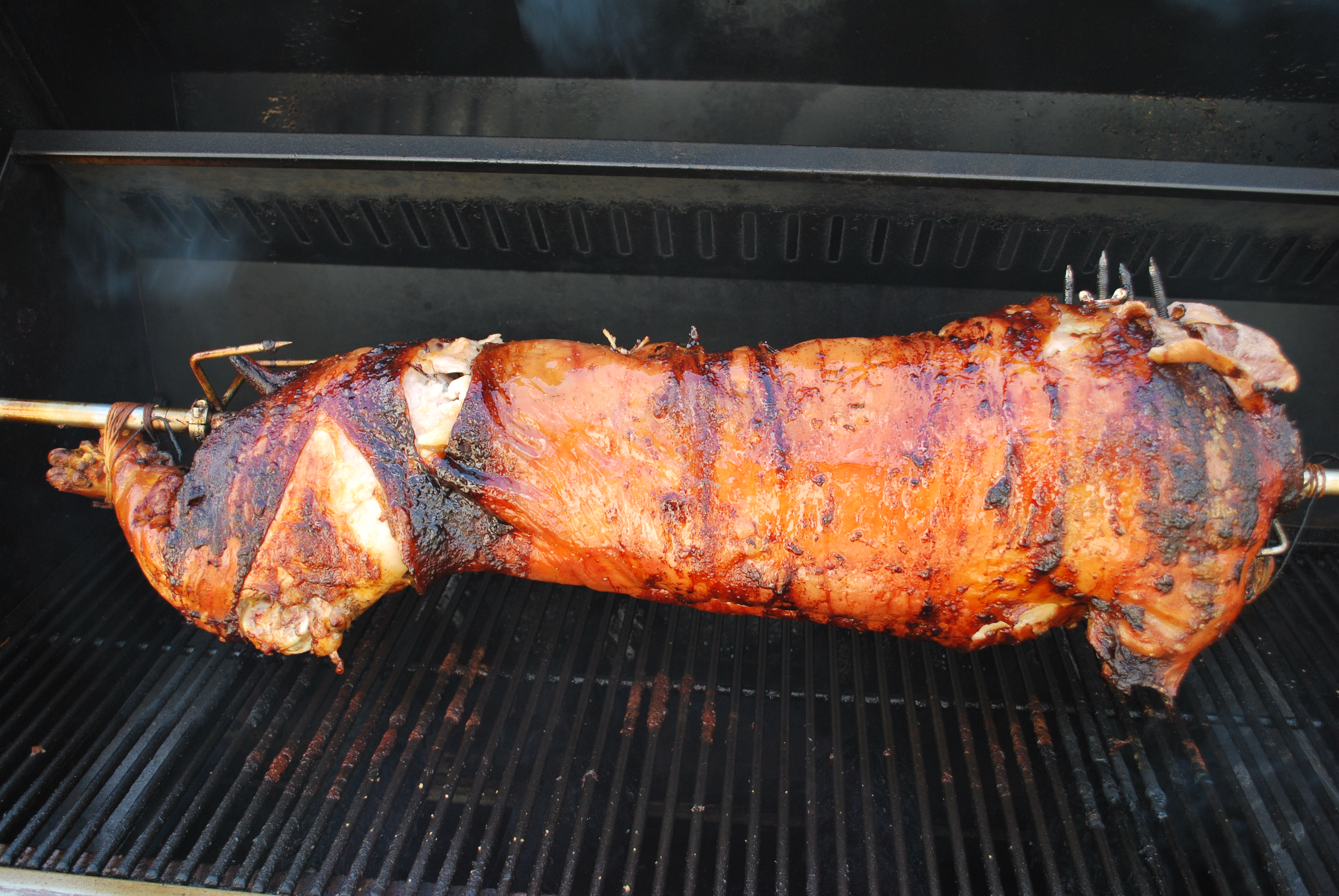
Slow-roasting pig on a rotisserie

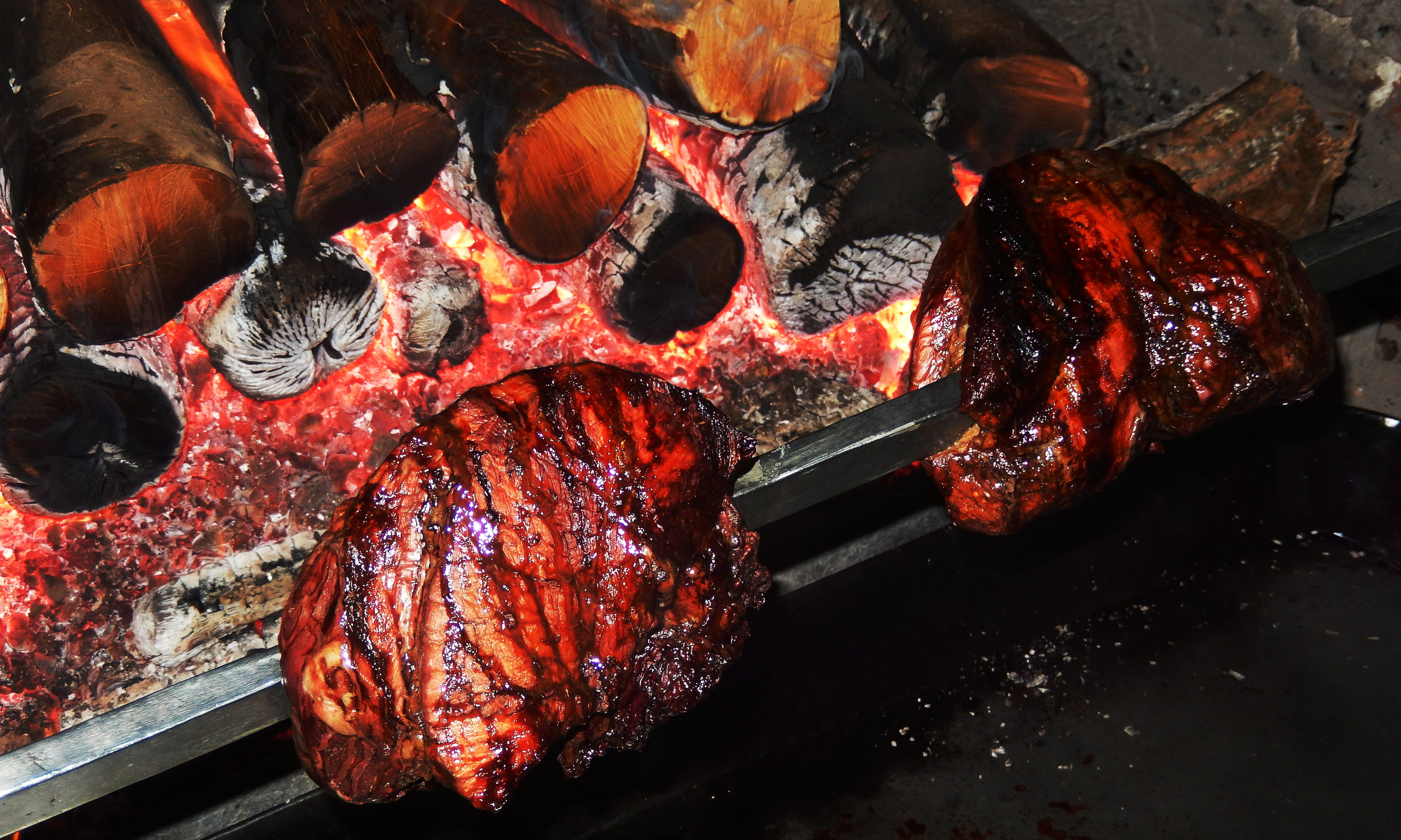
Tudor style roasting meat on a spit

Roasting is a cooking method that uses dry heat where hot air covers the food, cooking it evenly on all sides with temperatures of at least 151 °C (300 °F) from an open flame, oven, or other heat source. Roasting can enhance the flavor through caramelization and Maillard browning on the surface of the food. Roasting uses indirect, diffused heat (as in an oven), and is suitable for slower cooking of meat in a larger, whole piece. Meats and most root and bulb vegetables can be roasted. Any piece of meat, especially red meat, that has been cooked in this fashion is called a roast. Meats and vegetables prepared in this way are described as "roasted", e.g., roasted chicken or roasted squash.

== Methods ==
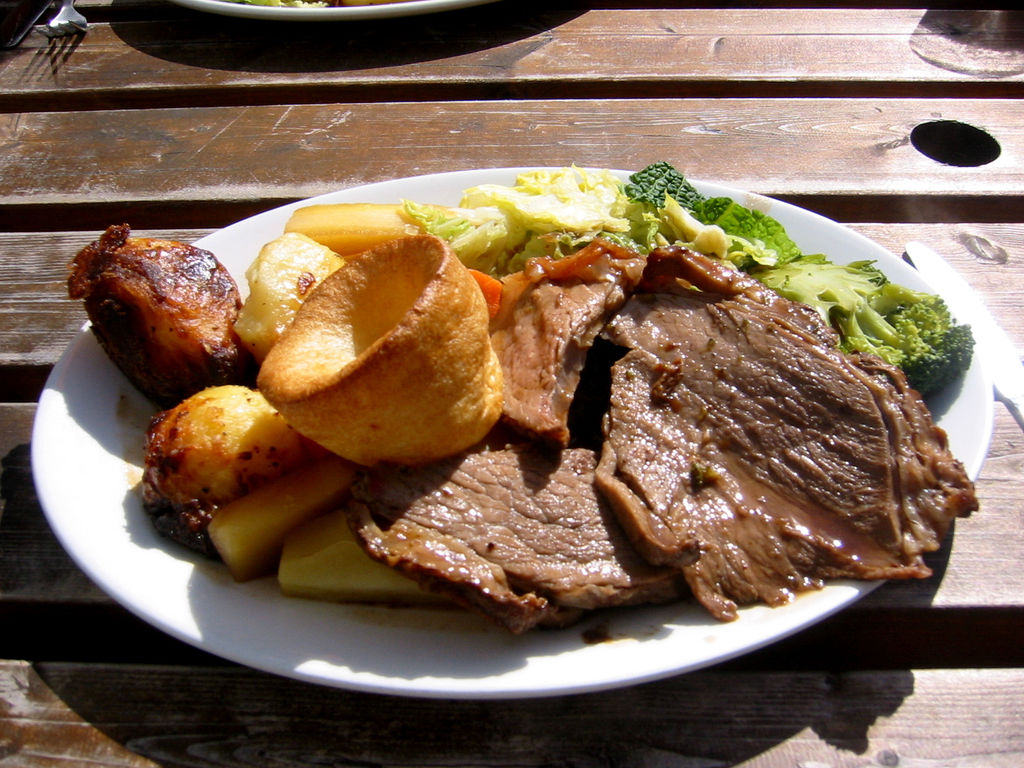
A Sunday roast consisting of roast beef, potatoes, vegetables, and Yorkshire pudding

For roasting, the food may be placed on a rack, in a roasting pan or, to ensure even application of heat, may be rotated on a spit or rotisserie. If a pan is used, the juice can be retained for use in gravy, Yorkshire pudding, etc. During oven roasting, hot air circulates around the meat, cooking all sides evenly. There are several methods for roasting meat: low-temperature cooking, high-temperature cooking, and a combination of both.

- A low-temperature oven, 95 to 160 °C (200 to 320 °F), is best when cooking with large cuts of meat, turkey and whole chickens. This is not technically roasting temperature, but it is called slow-roasting. The benefit of slow-roasting an item is less moisture loss and a more tender product. More of the collagen that makes meat tough is dissolved in slow cooking. At true roasting temperatures, 200 °C (390 °F) or more, the water inside the muscle is lost at a high rate.
- Cooking at high temperatures is beneficial if the cut is tender enough—as in filet mignon or strip loin—to be finished cooking before the juices escape. A reason for high temperature roasting is to brown the outside of the food, similar to browning food in a pan before pot roasting or stewing it. Fast cooking gives more variety of flavor, because the outside is brown while the center is much less done.
- The combination method uses high heat just at either the beginning or the end of the cooking process, with most of the cooking at a low temperature. This method produces the golden-brown texture and crust, but maintains more of the moisture than simply cooking at a high temperature, although the product will not be as moist as low-temperature cooking the whole time. Searing and then turning down to low is also beneficial when a dark crust and caramelized flavor is desired for the finished product.

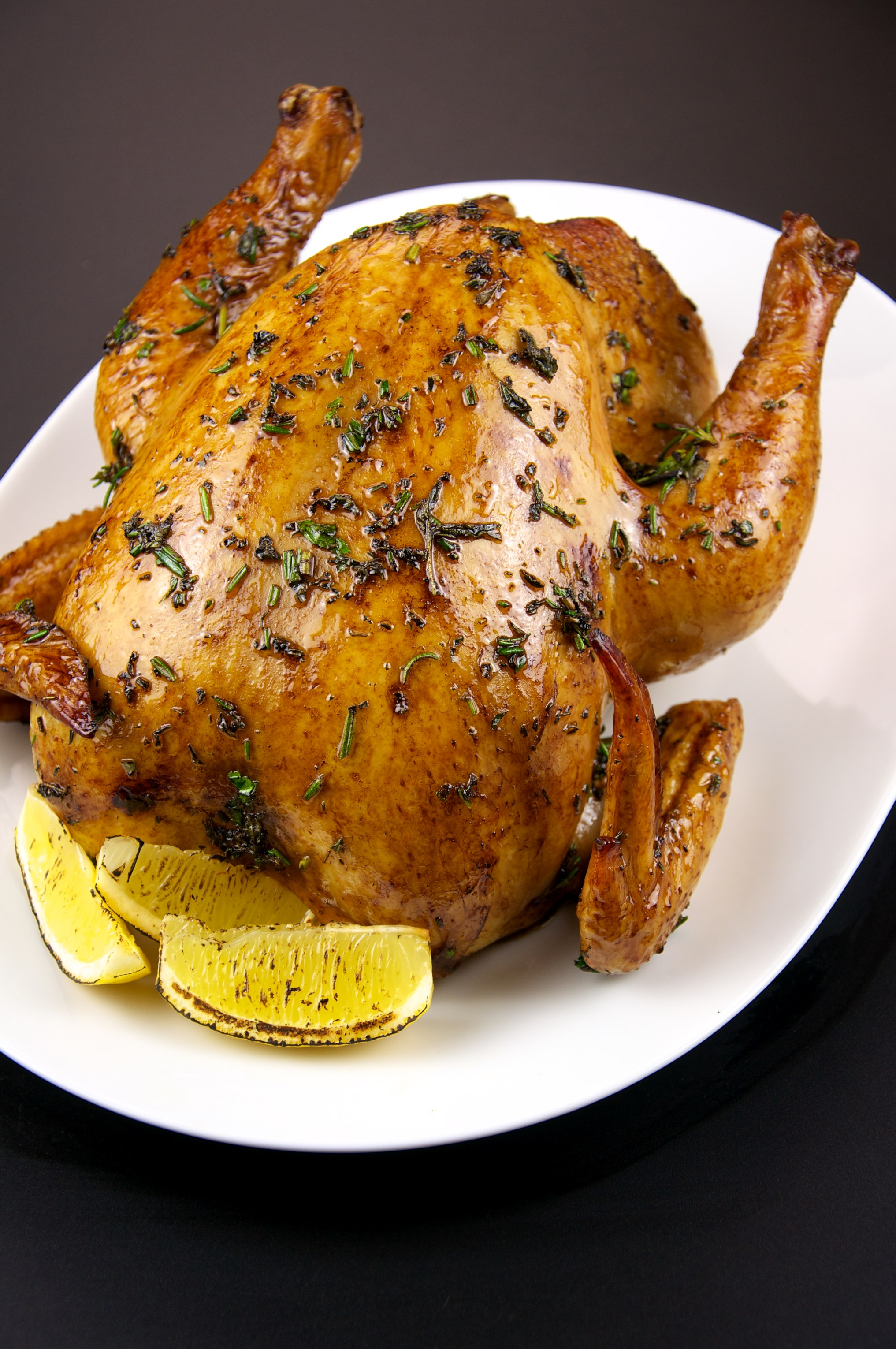
Whole roast chicken

In general, in either case, the meat is removed from the heat before it has finished cooking and left to sit for a few minutes, while the inside cooks further from the residual heat content, known as carry over cooking.

The objective in any case is to retain as much moisture as possible, while providing the texture and color. As meat cooks, the structure and especially the collagen breaks down, allowing juice to come out of the meat. So meat is juiciest at about medium rare while the juice is coming out. During roasting, meats and vegetables are frequently basted on the surface with butter, lard, or oil to reduce the loss of moisture by evaporation. In recent times, plastic oven bags have become popular for roasts. These cut cooking times and reduce the loss of moisture during roasting, but reduce flavor development from Maillard browning, somewhat more like (boiled or steamed) stew or pot roast. They are particularly popular for turkeys.

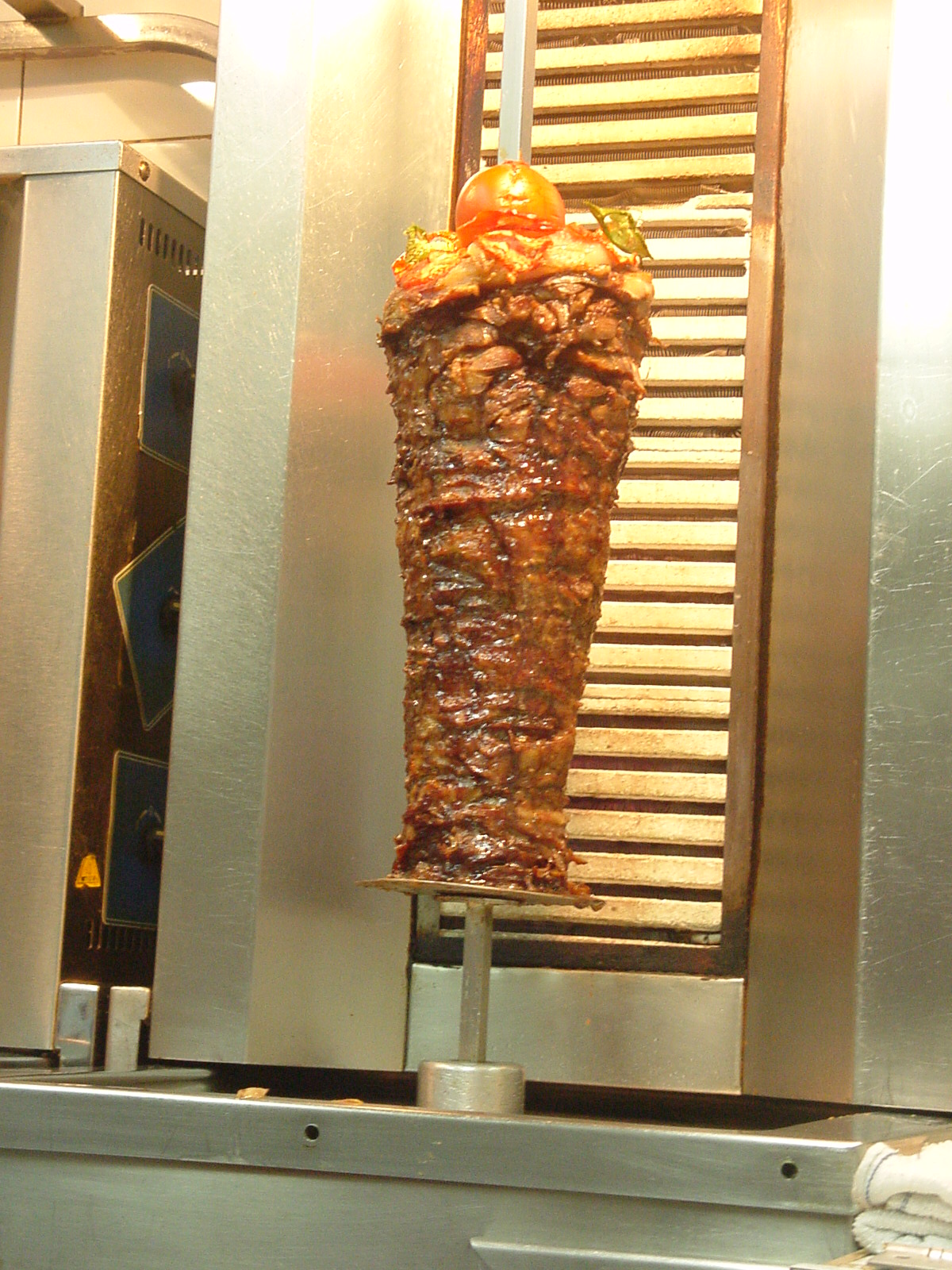
Shawarma prepared on a rotating spit

Until the late 19th century, roasting by dry heat in an oven was called baking. Roasting originally meant cooking meat or a bird on or in front of a fire, as with a grill or spit. It is one of the oldest forms of cooking known.

Traditionally recognized roasting methods consist only of baking and cooking over or near an open fire. Grilling is normally not technically a roast, since a grill (gridiron) is used. Barbecuing and smoking differ from roasting because of the lower temperature and controlled smoke application.

== Meat ==
Before the invention and widespread use of stoves, food was primarily cooked over open flames from a hearth. To roast meat, racks with skewers, or, if accessible, complicated gear arrangements, would be utilized to turn the piece(s). In the past, this method was often associated with the upper class and special occasions, rather than customary mealtimes, because it required freshly killed meat and close attention during cooking. It was easy to ruin the meat's taste with a smoky fire or negligence to rotate it at regular intervals. Thus, elite families, who were able to afford quality meat, appointed this task to servants or invested in technology like automatic turning devices. With further technological advances, cooking came to accommodate new opportunities. By the 1860s, working families were able to afford low-priced stove models that became sufficiently available. However, the key element of observation during roasting became difficult and dangerous to do with the coal oven. Hence, traditional roasting disappeared as kitchens became no longer equipped for this custom and soon thereafter, "baking" came to be "roasting".

Roasting can be applied to a wide variety of meat. In general, it works best for cooking whole chickens, turkey, and leaner cuts of lamb, pork, and beef. The aim is to highlight the flavor of the meat itself rather than a sauce or stew, as it is done in braising or other moist-heat methods. Many roasts are tied with string prior to roasting, often using the reef knot or the packer's knot. Tying holds them together during roasting, keeping any stuffing inside, and keeps the roast in a round profile, which promotes even cooking. A hock lock is a food accoutrement used to secure the hock (hind legs) of a bird such as a chicken or turkey during roasting and are typically composed of heat-resistant nylon or metal.

Red meats such as beef, lamb, and venison, and certain game birds are often roasted to be "medium rare" or "rare", meaning that the center of the roast is still red. Roasting is a preferred method of cooking for most poultry, and certain cuts of beef, pork, or lamb. Although there is a growing fashion in some restaurants to serve "rose pork", temperature monitoring of the center of the roast is the only sure way to avoid foodborne disease.

In Britain, Ireland, and Australia, a roast of meat may be referred to as a joint, or a leg, if it is a leg.

== Vegetables ==
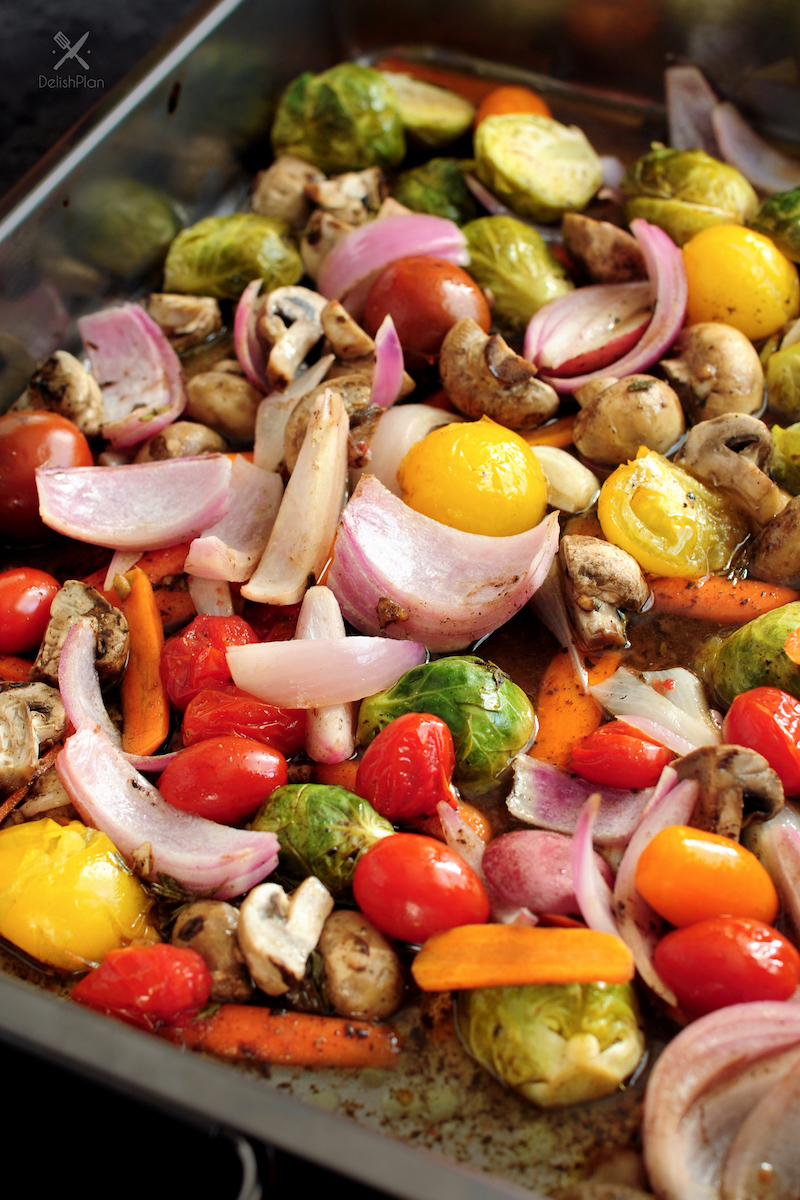
Roasted vegetables

Some vegetables, such as brussels sprouts, potatoes, carrots, eggplants/aubergines, zucchini/courgette, pumpkin, turnips, rutabagas/swedes, parsnips, cauliflower, asparagus, squash, peppers, yam and plantain, lend themselves to roasting as well. Roasted chestnuts are also a popular snack in winter.

== Fish ==
Roasting fish is done with whole fish, and will work well with snapper, or any medium-sized, whole round fish such as trout, ocean perch and black sea bass will work.

== Traybake ==
In the United States and Britain, a mix of vegetables and meat roasted together in the same pan are known as a traybake.

== Roasts in the context of the meal ==
Roast meats have typically been high-status foods, due in part to the expense and scarcity of meat and in part to the expense of the extra fuel needed for roasting, compared to the fuel used for boiling foods in a pot. For that reason, roast meats were the centerpiece of high-status meals for centuries.

=== Early use of the term ===
Among the earliest texts in Western Europe to include recipes for roast meats and fowl is Le Viandier (c. 1300), which includes twenty-nine recipes for various roasts, placed under the heading "Rostz de chair" (roast meats) in some manuscripts. Similar recipes under the heading "Rost de char" also appear in Le Ménagier de Paris (1393), which also includes menus (Note: The word "menus" appropriately describes this section of the Ménagier, but the first appearance of "menu" with that culinary meaning is in the much later Nouveau Dictionnaire de l’Académie françoise, 1718, p. II:50.) with roasts in the second and third stages of the meal.

In the later Petit traicté auquel verrez la maniere de faire cuisine (c. 1536), more widely known from a later edition titled Livre fort excellent de cuisine (1542), in a collection of menus at the end of the book, the meal is presented in four stages: the entree de table (entrance to the table), potaiges (foods boiled or simmered "in pots"), services de rost (meat or fowl "roasted" in dry heat), and issue de table (departure from the table).

The terms entree de table and issue de table are organizing words, "describing the structure of a meal rather than the food itself". The terms potaiges and rost indicate cooking methods but not ingredients. The menus, though, give some idea of both the ingredients and the cooking methods that were characteristic of each stage of the meal.

The meat and fowl considered appropriate for roasting included domestic fowl, feathered game, small furred game, suckling pig, and, less commonly, lamb. Roasts were rarely of other butcher's meat, large furred game, or organ meats.

Other dishes were often served alongside the roasts, including sauced and stuffed meats and meat pies. The roasts themselves might be accompanied by a sauce, but the sauce was served separately from the roast itself.

The arrangement of dishes in the Livre fort excellent is very similar to that of the menus in the Ménagier de Paris, written 150 years before the Petit traicté. One notable difference is that the roast fowl and meats in the Ménagier were often followed by roast fish, a practice not evident in the Livre fort excellent.

=== The roast in the "Classical Order" of table service ===
Between the mid-16th and mid-17th century, the stages of the meal underwent several significant changes. Notably, potage became the first stage of the meal and the entrée became the second stage, followed by the roast, entremets, and dessert.

While cookbooks and dictionaries of the 17th and 18th centuries rarely discuss the type of dishes appropriate to each stage of the meal with any specificity, roasts and the dishes of the other stages of the meal can be distinguished from each other by certain characteristics, such as their ingredients, cooking methods, and serving temperatures. The distinct characteristics of roasts for the roast course were at first loosely observed, or perhaps more accurately, the "rules" were in a formative stage for several decades. By the early 18th century, though, certain ingredients and cooking methods were increasingly confined to the roast stage of the meal.

In the 17th, 18th, and 19th centuries, meat and fowl for the roast course on meat days (Note: In accordance with church regulations in force from the Middle Ages to the 19th century, the ingredients for every stage of the meal varied between "meat days" (jours gras, literally "fat days"), when all foods were allowed, and "lean days" (jours maigres), when the church forbade consumption of meat and fowl but not fish. Until the 16th century, white meats (milk, cream, butter, and cheese) and eggs were additionally forbidden in Lent. Beginning in the 17th century, white meats were allowed in Lent. Beginning in the 19th century, eggs were also allowed in Lent.) included all sorts of domestic fowl, feathered game, and small furred game, ingredients that were less commonly included in entrées and entremets. Goose, gosling, and domestic duck were not fashionable in any course; turkeys and wild ducks were preferred in their place. Organ meats were often roasted, but they were served in the entrée and entremets courses, not in the roast course.

In the 17th century, large cuts of roasted butcher's meat and furred game were sometimes served in the roast course; sauced and stuffed meats and pies were also served alongside the roasts; but in the 18th and 19th centuries, all such dishes were served only in the entrée or entremets courses, always in a sauce. By the 18th century, only fowl, feathered game, and small furred game were considered appropriate for the roast course.

Roasted fowl and small game in Classical Service were spit-roasted and nicely browned, served "dry" and not in a sauce or ragoût. Sauces in the roast course might be served alongside the roasted fowl or game, but the roasts were not prepared or served in the sauce like roasted fowl and meats in the entrée course.

On lean days, fish replaced meat and fowl in every stage of the meal other than dessert. In the roast course, whole fish replaced meat-day roasts, but the fish were poached or fried, not roasted. The fish were substitutions or counterparts to the roasts served on meat days, corresponding to their position in the meal but not their cooking method.

The salient feature of lean-day fish in the roast course, whether poached or fried, was that they were served "dry", placed on a napkin and not served in a sauce or ragoût. In contrast, poached and fried fish served as entrées, hors d’œuvre, or relevés, were always served in a sauce or ragoût. Additionally, poached fish in the roast course were prepared with the scales still on the fish, if they were attractive, unlike whole fish served as relevés, which were always served without scales.

== Gallery ==
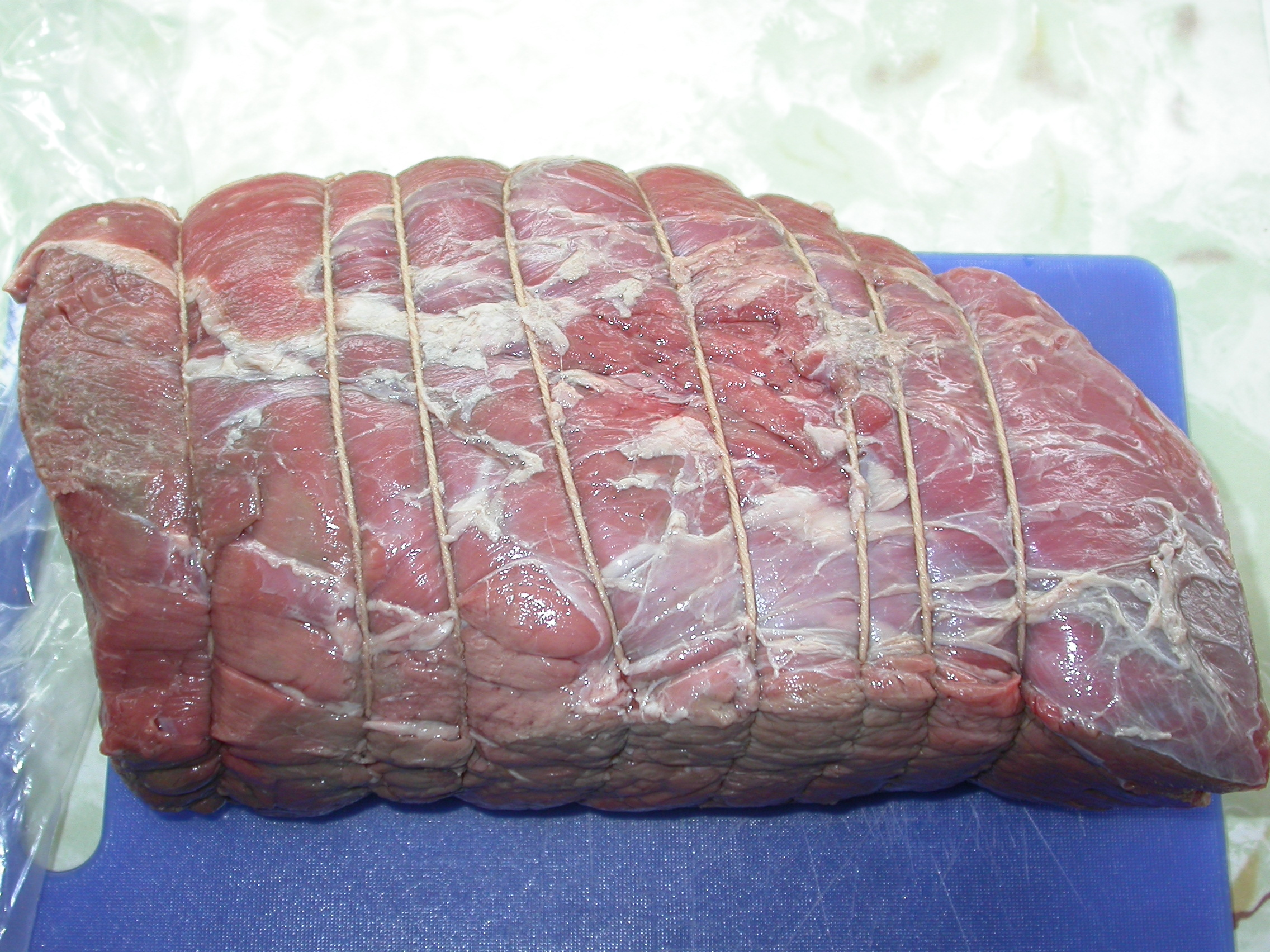
A 3 kilograms (6.6 lb) top round roast of beef, tied and ready to be browned and roasted

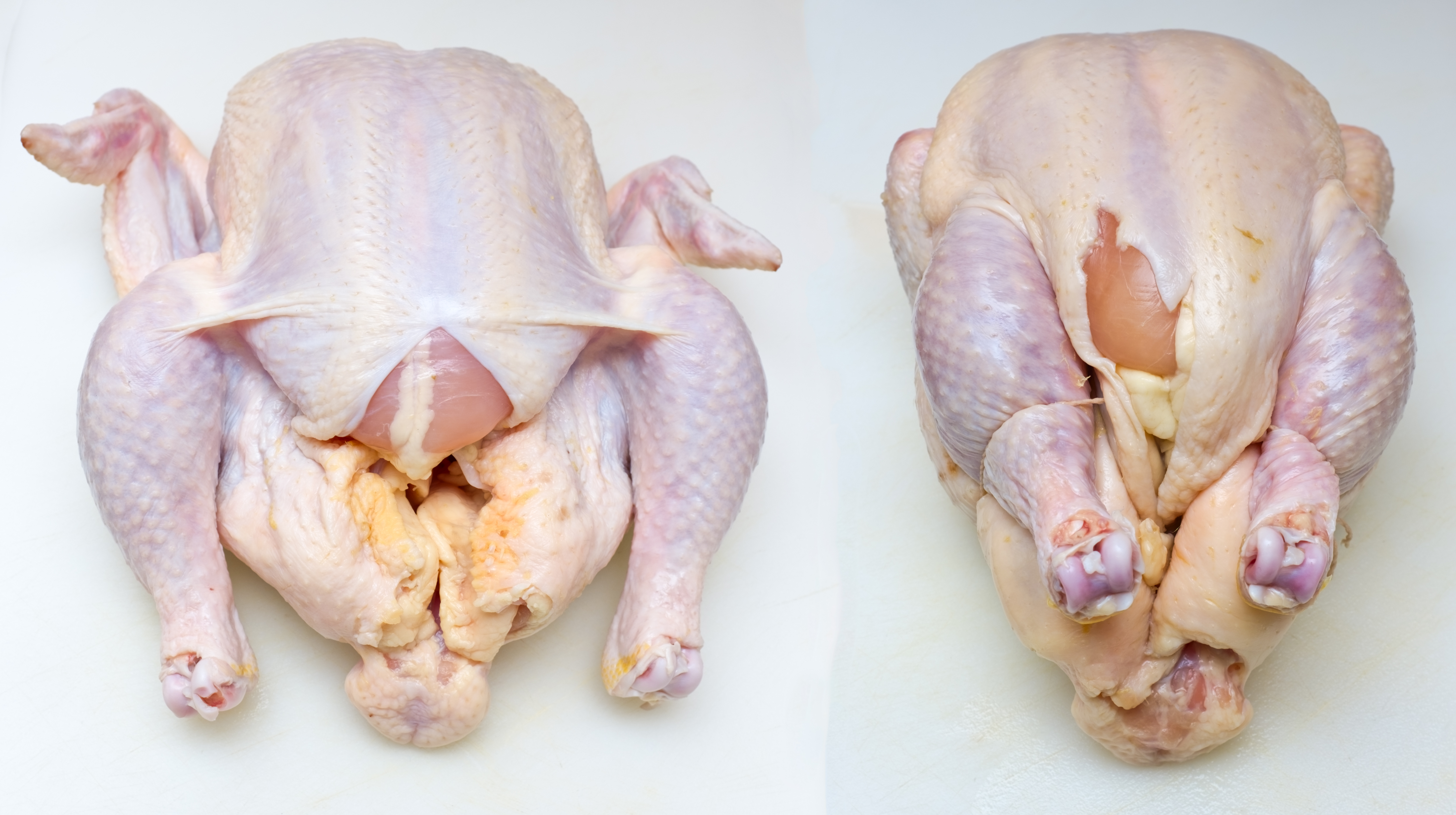
Untrussed (untied) and trussed chicken for roasting

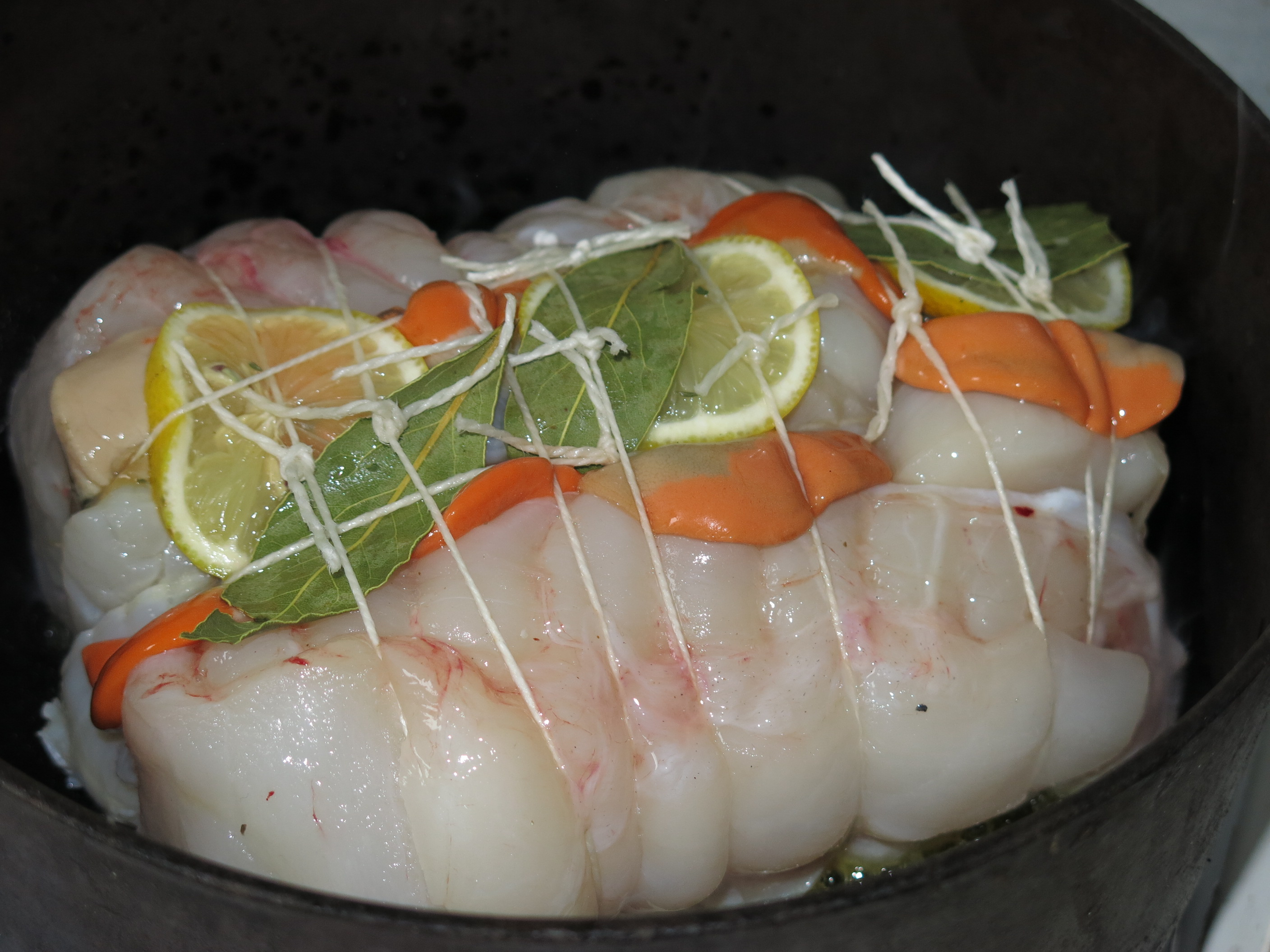
Roasting of burbot with scallops (France) to be cooked

== See also ==
- Asado
- Braising or pot roasting
- Coffee roasting
- Dry roasting
- Hendl (roasted chicken)
- Low-temperature cooking
- Pan frying
- Polycyclic aromatic hydrocarbons
- Roast beef
- Roasting pan

== Notes, references, and sources ==
=== Sources ===
- Albala, Ken; Tomasik, Timothy, eds. (2014). The Most Excellent Book of Cookery, Livre fort excellent de cuysine. Totnes, Devon: Prospect Books. ISBN 978-1903018965.
- Arvind. Roasting and Smoking of Foods (INFLIBNET Centre ed.). New Delhi: Roasting and Smoking of Foods.
- Ashley, Clifford W. (1944). The Ashley Book of Knots. New York: Doubleday. pp. 36–38.
- Brereton, Georgine E.; Ferrier, Janet M., eds. (1981). Le Menagier de Paris. Oxford: Clarendon Press. ISBN 0198157487.
- "Cooking Meat? Check the New Recommended Temperatures". www.usda.gov.
- Failure to Cook These Foods Properly May Cause Foodborne Illness (PDF), Public Health Dept. of Kern County, 12 August 2015
- Flandrin, Jean-Louis (2007) [2001]. Arranging the Meal: A History of Table Service in France [L’Ordre des mets]. Translated by Johnson, Julie E. Berkeley: University of California Press. ISBN 978-0520238855.
- "Hock Locks and Other Accoutrements" (PDF). USDA FSIS. October 2009.
- Horowitz, Roger (2006). Putting Meat on the American Table: Taste, Technology, Transformation. The Johns Hopkins University Press. pp. 5–7.
- Hyman, Philip; Hyman, Mary (1992). "Les livres de cuisine et le commerce des recettes en France aux 15e et 16e siècles". In Carole Lambert (ed.). Du manuscrit à la table. Paris, Montréal: Champion-Slatkin—Les Presses de l'Université de Montréal. ISBN 978-2852037076.
- Jurafsky, Dan (2014). The Language of Food. New York and London: W.W. Norton & Company. ISBN 978-0393240832.
- Lang, Jennifer Harvey, ed. (1988). Larousse Gastronomique: The New American Edition of the World's Greatest Culinary Encyclopedia. New York: Crown Publishers, Inc.
- "Recipe: Traybakes pack big flavor into one-pan meals", The Independent, 22 February 2022
- Scully, Terence (1995). The Art of Cookery in the Middle Ages. Woodbridge: The Boydell Press. ISBN 0851156118.
- Scully, Terence, ed. (1988). The Viandier of Taillevent. Ottawa: University of Ottawa Press. ISBN 978-0776601748.
- Siavetti, Stephanie (16 December 2017). "Roast Chestnuts: A Perfect Winter Snack". HuffPost.
- Tomasik, Timothy J. (May 2016). "Cuisine by the Cut of One's Trousers: Cookbook Marketing in Early Modern France". Food and History. 14 (2–3): 223–247. doi:10.1484/J.FOOD.5.115341. ISSN 1780-3187.
