= Haybox =

Style of retained-heat cooker

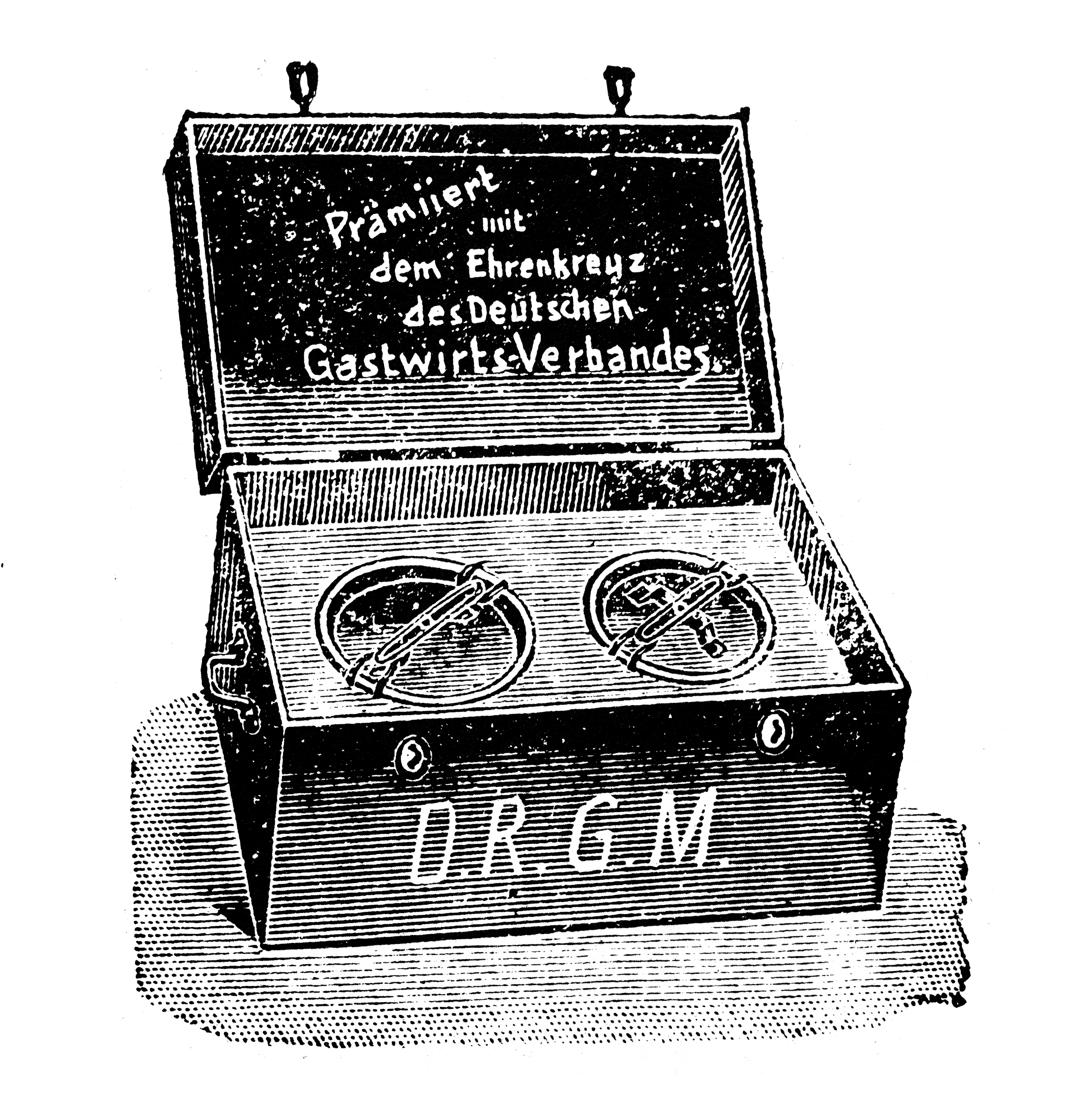
German haybox from the end of the 19th century

A haybox, straw box, fireless cooker, insulation cooker, wonder oven, self-cooking apparatus, norwegian cooker or retained-heat cooker is a cooker that utilizes the heat of the food being cooked to complete the cooking process. Food items to be cooked are heated to boiling point, and then insulated. Over a period of time, the food items cook by the heat captured in the insulated container. Generally, it takes three times the normal cooking time to cook food in a haybox.

== History ==
Hayboxes are so called because hay or straw were the commonly used insulators. Pots of food would be brought to a boil and then placed in a box filled with hay or straw. Additional hay or straw would be added around and on top of the pot. The inventor Karl von Drais developed a novel form of haybox in the first part of the 19th century.

During World War II, hayboxes were used as a way of conserving rationed cooking fuel.

Campers and hikers have used variations of hayboxes for years, heating their food in the morning and then storing the heated pot in a sleeping bag or backpack. In this way a hot meal is available for eating at the end of the day.

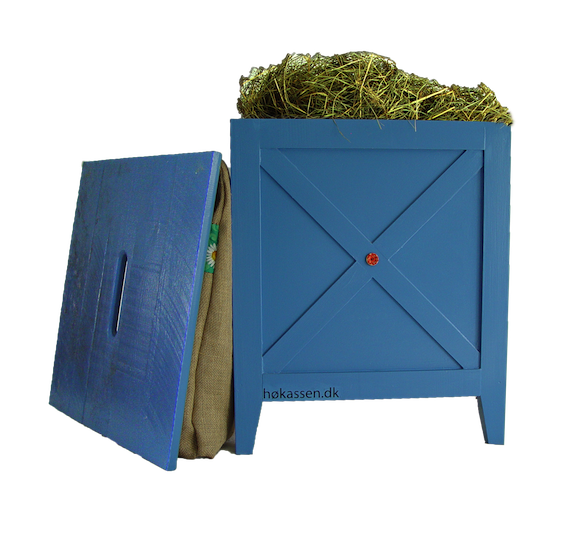
Danish haybox, 2009

Commercial designs based on this principle differed only in details of construction, and the kind of insulating material used. Some types were provided with soapstone or iron plates which were heated during the preliminary cooking on the stove and then placed in the fireless cooker either over or under the cooking pot. In these types, a non-flammable insulating material was used. A successful home-made strategy was to take a box so large that the cooking pot when placed in it could be surrounded by a thick layer of non-conducting material, such as hay, excelsior or crumpled paper. A cushion was placed over the pot and a tight-fitting lid was placed over all.

Versions of hayboxes that use wool as the insulator have been used as a cost-saving measure in the face of rising fuel prices caused by the 2022 Russian invasion of Ukraine.

== Advantages and disadvantages ==
Haybox cooking can save vast amounts of fuel, but there is a risk of bacterial growth if the food items are allowed to remain in the danger zone (41−140 °F or 5−60 °C) for one or more hours. In order to reduce the risk, food cooked in hayboxes can be reheated to boiling before eating, or a food thermometer can be used.

== Gallery ==
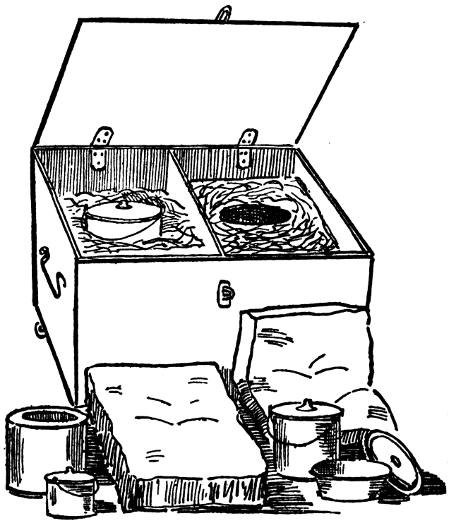
Haybox with 2 compartments

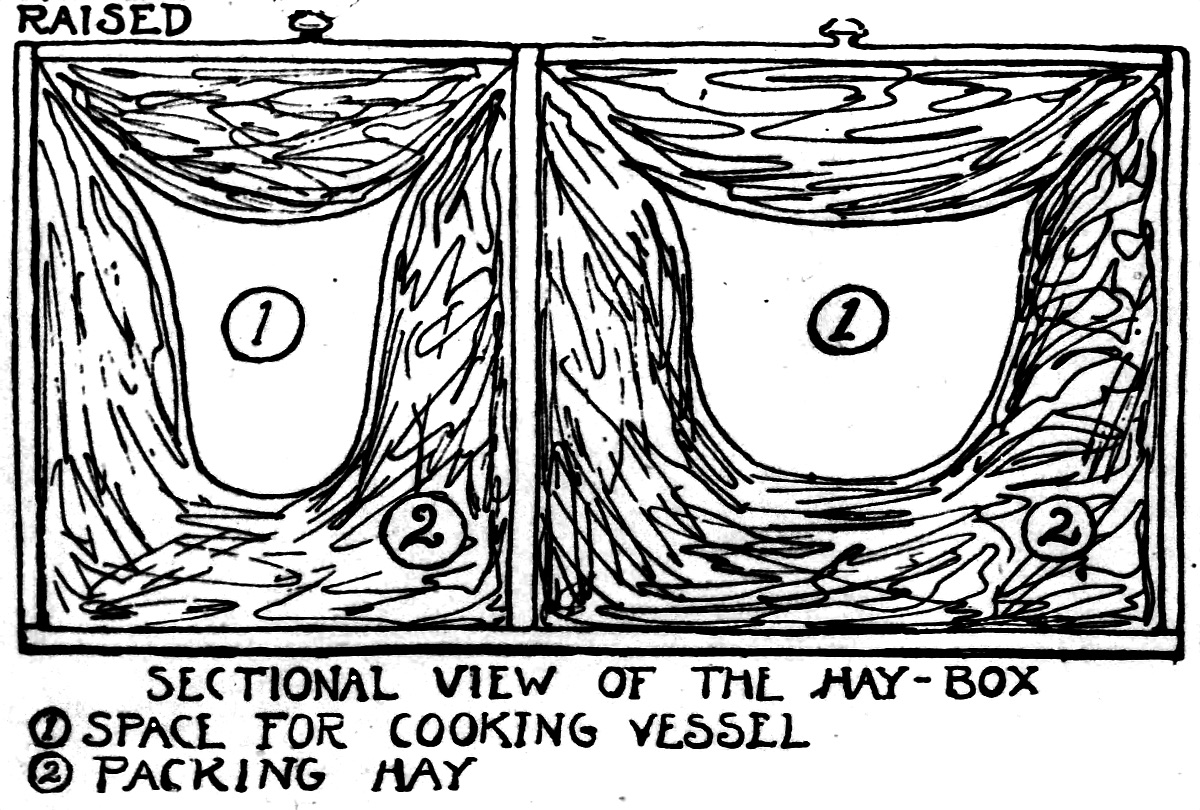
A double-chambered haybox schematic as drawn by Marguerite Martyn in the St. Louis Post-Dispatch, 1906

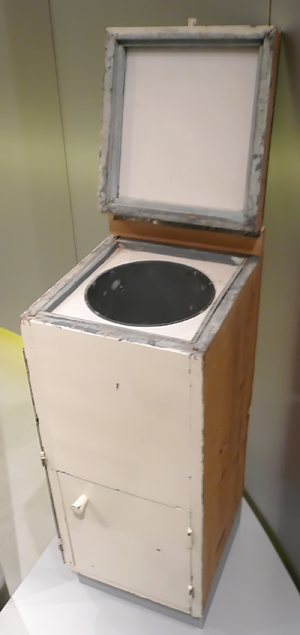
Fireless cooker from the Frankfurt kitchen, 1926-1930, with open lid

== See also ==
- Carryover cooking
- Thermal cooking
- Slow cooker
- AGA cooker
- Chambers stove
- Wonderbag
