= Qualified Through Verification =

Qualified Through Verification (QTV), one of the United States Department Of Agriculture process verification programs, enables those in the processed fruit and vegetable industry to gain official certification of the wholesomeness of their products to improve marketing opportunities. Under this voluntary, fee-for-service program, AMS, using HACCP-based principles, first inspects the company’s facilities to ensure they are properly designed, are consistent with the Food and Drug Administration’s good manufacturing practices, have on-site microbiological testing, follow accepted sanitary operating procedures, and so forth. Ongoing monitoring, including periodic unannounced site visits, sampling, and audits by AMS are intended to ensure that the firm maintains its QTV status, which then authorizes it to use an official AMS mark, the QTV shield, on product labels and in advertisements.
