= Slow cooker =

Countertop electrical cooking appliance used to simmer food

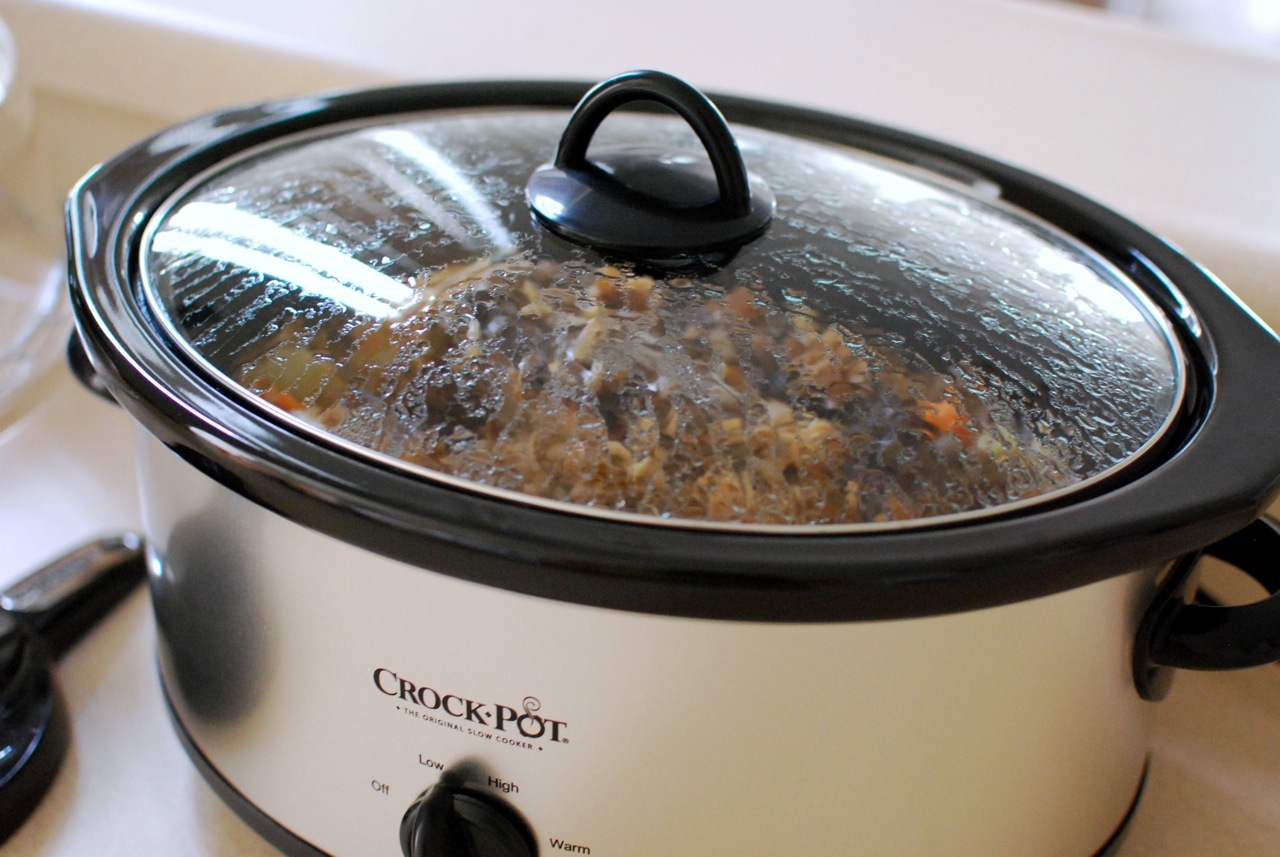
A modern, oval-shaped slow cooker

A slow cooker (also known as a crock-pot after a trademark owned by Sunbeam Products, but sometimes used generically in the English-speaking world) is a countertop electrical cooking appliance used to simmer at a lower temperature than other cooking methods, such as baking, boiling, and frying. This facilitates unattended cooking for many hours of dishes that would otherwise be boiled, such as a pot roast, soups, stews and other dishes (including beverages, desserts and dips).

== History of slow cooking ==
Long before the invention of electric cooking devices, cultures across Europe, Asia and North Africa relied on heavy cast iron Dutch ovens and pottery, such as the Moroccan tagine. to tenderise tough cuts of meat and simmer pulses over low and sustained heat. These traditional non-electric methods frequently utilised the residual heat of brick hearth ovens or dying wood fires.

The purpose of slow cooking stems from a universal culinary challenge: transforming fibrous, collagen-rich cuts of meat and hard legumes into tender meals without temperature controls. Throughout the world, different cooks discovered that thermal energy can break down connective tissue over many hours. This renders tough ingredients tender and easier to eat while they can soak up flavors from ingredients cooked with them.

=== Regional traditions and vessels ===
Different regions developed distinct culinary hardware tailored to local resources and available fuel sources. In Europe, heavy cast iron Dutch ovens and glazed pottery cocottes became staples in French and Northern European kitchens. Placed directly onto embers or inside brick masonry ovens, these heavy lidded vessels trapped steam to create a continuous internal basting cycle. In North Africa, the Moroccan tagine utilises a conical pottery lid that forces rising vapours to condense and trickle back down onto the ingredients. This design conserves moisture in arid environments where water and fuel are scarce. In Asia, deep pottery casseroles and heavy iron vessels were frequently used across China and Southeast Asia. These pots allowed for prolonged simmering over small charcoal brazier fires, often used for sand pot dishes or long simmered master stocks.

=== The mechanics of residual heat ===
Before gas lines and electrical grids, energy conservation was essential. Traditional cooks mastered the art of thermal inertia. By banking a wood fire with ash or utilising the cooling brickwork of communal bread ovens after the morning bake, households maximised residual heat. Heavy pots absorbed this stored energy and maintained a stable and low temperature for hours, establishing the foundation for centuries of heritage cookery.

== History of electric slow cookers ==
Slow cookers achieved popularity in the United States during the 1940s, when many women began to work outside the home. They could start dinner cooking in the morning before going to work and finish preparing the meal in the evening when they came home.

The Naxon Utilities Corporation of Chicago, under the leadership of electrical engineer Irving Naxon (born Irving Nachumsohn), developed the Naxon Beanery All-Purpose Cooker for the purposes of cooking a bean meal. Naxon was inspired by a story related by his mother, how in her native Lithuanian town his grandmother made a traditional Jewish stew called cholent, which took several hours to cook in an oven. A 1950 advertisement shows a slow cooker called the "Simmer Crock" made by the Industrial Radiant Heat Corporation of Gladstone, New Jersey.

The Rival Company of Kansas City, Missouri, bought Naxon in 1970, acquiring Naxon's 1940 patent for the bean simmer cooker. Rival asked inventor Alex MacMaster, from Boonville, Missouri, to develop Naxon's bean cooker into a large scale production model that could cook an entire family meal, going further than just cooking a bean meal. Alex also designed and produced the mass-production machines for Rival's manufacturing line of the Crock-Pot. The cooker was then reintroduced under the trademark "Crock-Pot" in 1971. In 1974, Rival introduced removable stoneware inserts, making the appliance easier to clean. As of 2016, the Crock-Pot brand belongs to Newell Brands.

Other brands of this appliance, past and present, include Cuisinart, GE, Hamilton Beach, KitchenAid, Magic Chef, West Bend Housewares, and the now-defunct American Electric Corporation.

== Design ==
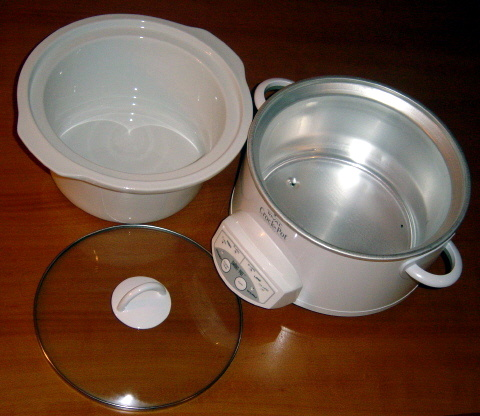
A new slow cooker. This one has a removable ceramic crock (upper left), glass lid (lower left), and heater housing (right) with push-button controls, instead of the original single knob.

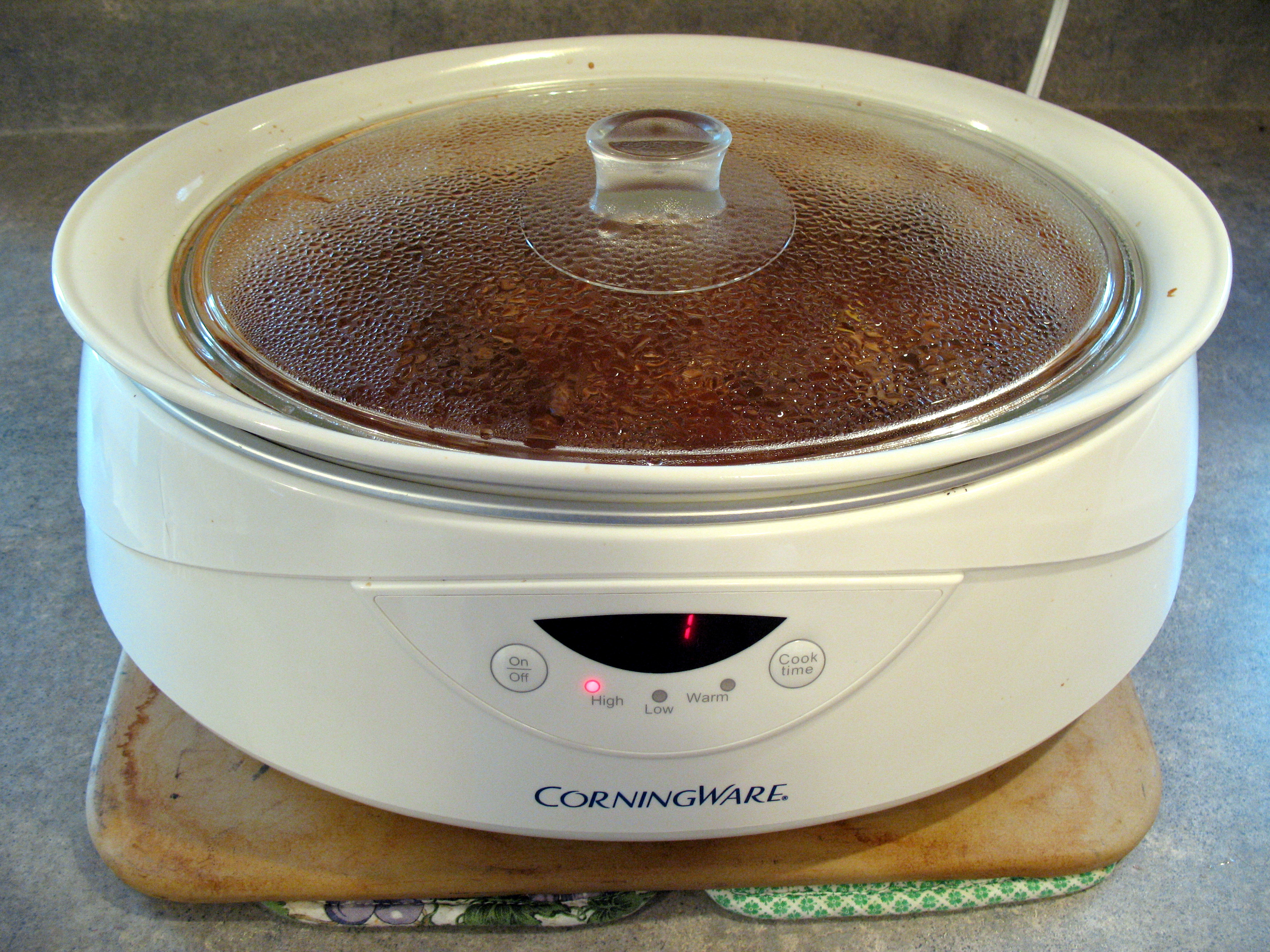
An oval-shaped slow cooker with membrane switch push-button controls and a digital timer

A basic slow cooker consists of a lidded round or oval cooking pot made of glazed ceramic, surrounded by a housing, usually metal, containing an electric heating element. The lid is often made of glass, and seated in a groove in the pot edge; condensed vapor collects in the groove and provides a seal to the atmosphere. The contents of a crock pot are effectively at atmospheric pressure, despite the water vapor generated inside the pot. A slow cooker is different from a pressure cooker and presents no danger of an abrupt pressure release.

The crock, or ceramic pot, acts as both a cooking container and a thermal reservoir. Slow cookers come in capacities from 500 mL (17 US fl oz) to 7 L (7.4 US qt). Because the heating elements are generally located at the bottom and often also partway up the sides, most slow cookers have a minimum recommended liquid level to avoid uncontrolled heating. Some newer models have coated aluminium or steel crocks which, while not as efficient as ceramic at retaining heat, do allow for quicker heating and cooling, as well as the ability to use the crock on the stove top to brown meat prior to cooking.

Many slow cookers have two or more heat settings, e.g., low, medium, high, and sometimes a "keep warm" setting; some have continuously variable power. Early slow cookers had no temperature control and delivered a constant heat to the contents. The temperature of the contents rises until it reaches the boiling point, at whereupon the energy goes into gently boiling the liquid closest to the hot surface. At a lower setting, it may just simmer at a temperature below the boiling point. While many basic slow cookers still operate in this manner, newer models have electronics for precise temperature control, delayed cooking starts and control via a computer or mobile device.

== Operation ==
To use a slow cooker, the cook places raw food and a liquid, such as stock, water, or wine, in the slow cooker. Some recipes call for pre-heated liquid. The cook puts the lid on the slow cooker and turns it on. Some cookers automatically switch from cooking to warming (maintaining the temperature at 71–74 °C (160–165 °F)) after a fixed time or after the internal temperature of the food, as determined by a probe, reaches a specified value.

The heating element heats the contents to a steady temperature in the 79–93 °C (174–199 °F) range. The contents are enclosed by the crock and the lid, and attain an essentially constant temperature. The vapor that is produced at this temperature condenses on the bottom of the lid and returns as liquid, into which some water-soluble vitamins are leached.

The liquid transfers heat from the pot walls to its contents, and also distributes flavors. The slow cooker's lid is essential to prevent the warm vapor from escaping, taking heat with it and cooling the contents.

Basic cookers, which have only high, medium, low, or keep warm settings and must be turned on and off manually. More advanced cookers have computerized timing devices that let a cook program the cooker to perform multiple operations, such as two hours high, followed by two hours low, followed by warm, and to delay the start of cooking.

Because food cooked in a slow cooker stays warm for a long time after it is switched off, people can use the slow cookers to take food elsewhere to eat without reheating. Some slow cookers have lids that seal to prevent their contents from spilling during transport.

The ability to food to be slow-cooked ahead of time is regarded by some cooks as convenient. Drawing little energy, it is used in some households so it can draw entirely on 1–2 kW solar panels during the day.

Slow cookers are less dangerous than ovens or stove tops due to their lower operating temperatures and closed lids. However, they still contain a large amount of foods and liquids at temperatures close to boiling, and they can cause serious scalds if spilled.

== Recipes ==
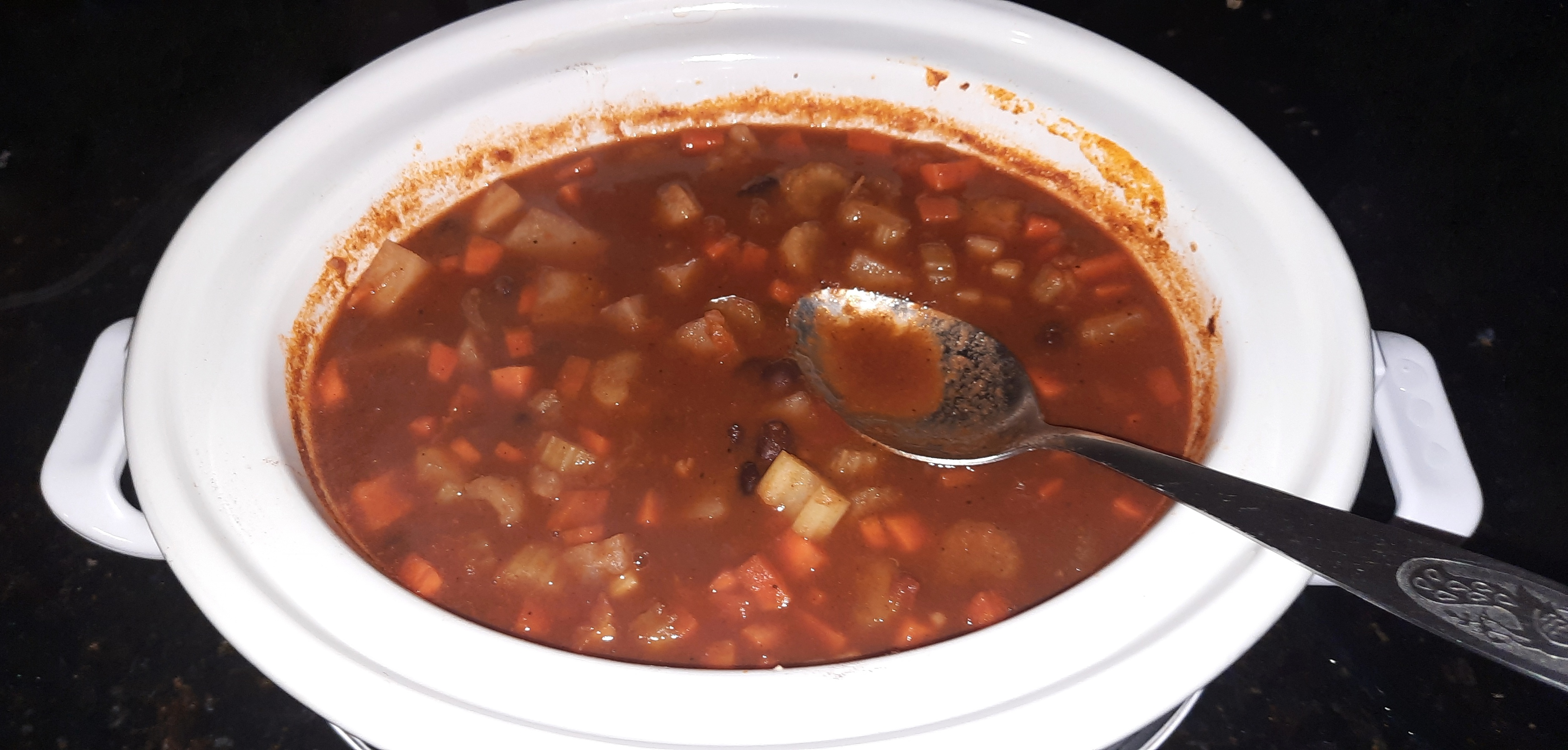
A vegetarian stew cooked using a slow cooker

Recipes intended for other cooking methods must be modified for slow cookers. Quantities of liquids may need adjustment, as there is a little evaporation, but there should be enough liquid to cover the food. Many published recipes for slow cookers are designed primarily for convenience and use few ingredients, and often use prepared sauces or seasonings. The long, moist cooking is particularly suitable for tough and cheap cuts of meat including pork shoulder, chuck steak and brisket. For many slow-cooked dishes, these cuts give better results than more expensive ones. They are also often used to cook while unattended, meaning the cook can fill the pot with its ingredients and come back several hours later to a ready meal.

== Taste and texture ==
Cheaper cuts of meat with connective tissue and lean muscle fibers are suitable for stewing, as long slow cooking softens connective tissue without toughening the muscle. Slow cooking leaves gelatinized tissue in the meat, so that it may be advantageous to start with a richer liquid.

The low temperature of slow-cooking makes it almost impossible to burn even food that has been cooked too long. However, some meats and most vegetables become nearly tasteless or "raggy" if over-cooked.

Slow cookers do not provide sufficient heat to compensate for loss of moisture and heat due to frequent removal of the lid, e.g., to add and remove food in perpetual stews, (pot-au-feu, olla podrida). Added ingredients must be given time to cook before the food can be eaten.

== Nutrition ==
Some vitamins and other trace nutrients are lost, particularly from vegetables, partially by enzyme action during cooking and partially due to heat degradation. When vegetables are cooked at higher temperatures these enzymes are rapidly denatured and have less time to act during cooking. Since slow cookers work at temperatures well below boiling point and do not rapidly denature enzymes, vegetables tend to lose trace nutrients. Blanched vegetables, having been exposed to very hot water, have already had these enzymes rendered largely ineffective, so a blanching or sauteing pre-cook stage leaves more vitamins intact. This is often a smaller nutrient loss than over-boiling and can be lessened to an extent by not removing the lid until the food is done.

Slow cookers should not be used to cook dried kidney beans and other legume seeds. These foods contain a highly toxic lectin, phytohemagglutinin, making as few as four raw beans toxic. This lectin is only deactivated by long soaking, then boiling in fresh water at 100 °C (212 °F) for at least thirty minutes. Information published by the United States Food and Drug Administration states that slow cookers should not be used to cook bean containing dishes. Commercially canned beans are fully cooked and are safe to use. Pressure cooking also deactivates the lectins.

== See also ==
- Beanpot
- Carryover cooking
- Combi steamer
- Haybox
- Hot pot
- List of cooking appliances
- Low-temperature cooking
- Rice cooker
- Remoska
- Sous vide
- Thermal cooking
