= Nomiku =

Defunct San Francisco-based company

- Type: Private
- Industry: Home appliances
- Founded: 2012; 14 years ago
- Founders: Lisa and Abe Fetterman
- Defunct: December 13, 2019
- Headquarters: San Francisco
- Website: nomiku.com

Nomiku was a company making sous vide immersion circulators designed for the home cook based in San Francisco. The company first started as a Kickstarter project in 2012. Nomiku was intended to provide access to sous-vide cooking. In 2017 the company started to offer home delivery of prepared meals that are prepared with the sous-vide method, but stopped operating in December 2019.

== Company history ==
Nomiku was founded by Lisa Q. Fetterman, Abe Fetterman, and Wipop Bam Suppipat. Previously, Lisa and Abe started their first company together, called Lower East Kitchen, while living in New York City. After relocating to San Francisco, Lisa and Abe decided to pursue their sous vide endeavors further and joined the hardware startup accelerator Haxlr8r.

Nomiku's name is a shortened version of the Japanese phrase “Nomikui” (飲み食い), which means “eating and drinking”.

In 2017, Nomiku began to offer a meal delivery service that shipped pre-packaged, pre-cooked, pre-portioned meals to customers that could be prepared using sous vide cooking in 30 minutes. An investment from Samsung helped the company develop an RFID enabled sous vide version of their Nomiku immersion cooker and expand the business from a connected hardware device to a subscription meal delivery service.

On December 13, 2019, the company emailed its customers that they would be discontinuing the Nomiku Smart Cooker and Nomiku Meals effective immediately, suspending operations.

== Founders ==
Lisa Q. Fetterman was the CEO of Nomiku. A graduate of New York University's Arthur L. Carter Journalism Institute, she worked in several fine dining restaurants. Fetterman also worked as a journalist at many publications. She has been named Forbes 30 Under 30 as well as Zagat 30 Under 30 for her work with Nomiku.

Abe Fetterman holds a PhD from Princeton specializing in Plasma Physics and Astrophysics. He was the CTO of Nomiku and helped Lisa conceive Lower East Kitchen and develop their Ember Kit.

Wipop Bam Suppipat was Nomiku's third co-founder and designer. Suppipat earned his Industrial Design degree from the Rhode Island School of Design and was classically trained at the French Culinary Institute.

== Products ==
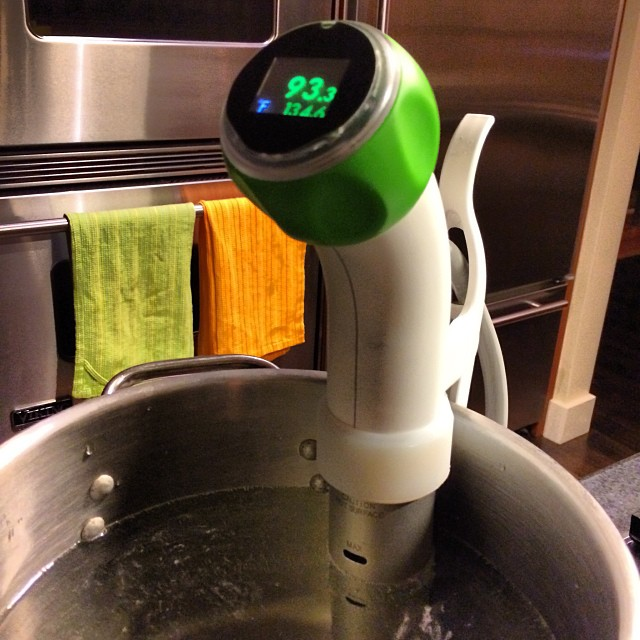
The first generation Nomiku sous-vide cooker, attached to the back of a pot

In addition to the original Nomiku Immersion sous vide machine, Fetterman authored a cookbook with Meesha Halm and Scott Peabody, Sous Vide at Home, that was published by Penguin Random House in November 2016. The book was a bestseller on Amazon, and a follow up, Sous Vide Made Simple, was published in October 2018 by Ten Speed Press.

- The Original Nomiku Immersion Circulator.
- WiFi Nomiku
- Sous-vide-ready meats

== See also ==
- Sous vide
- Low-temperature cooking
