= Hot dog cart =

Mobile food stand selling hot dogs

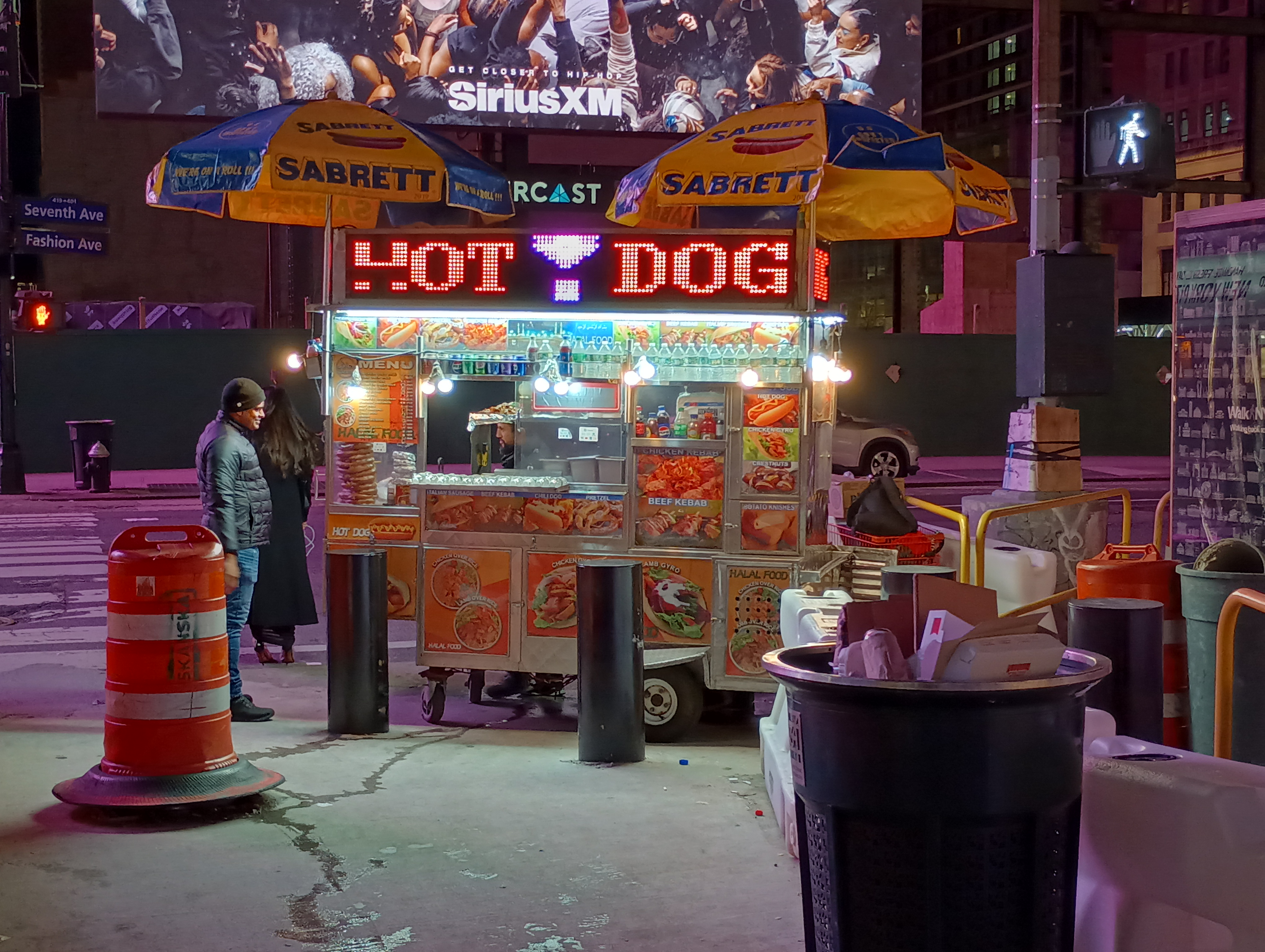
A hot dog cart in New York City

A hot dog cart is a specialized mobile food stand for preparing and selling street food, specifically hot dogs, to passersby. In some jurisdictions, a cart operator must meet stringent health regulations designed to protect the public. Hot dog carts are quick and easy food services, supplying millions of people with food every day.

In 2015 the U.S. Hot Dog Council estimated that 15% of the approximately 10 billion hot dogs consumed by Americans in 2014 were purchased from a mobile hot dog vendor cart. Hot dog carts are very common in New York City, and most of the hot dogs purveyed by hot dog carts in New York City are sourced from Sabrett.

== Overview ==
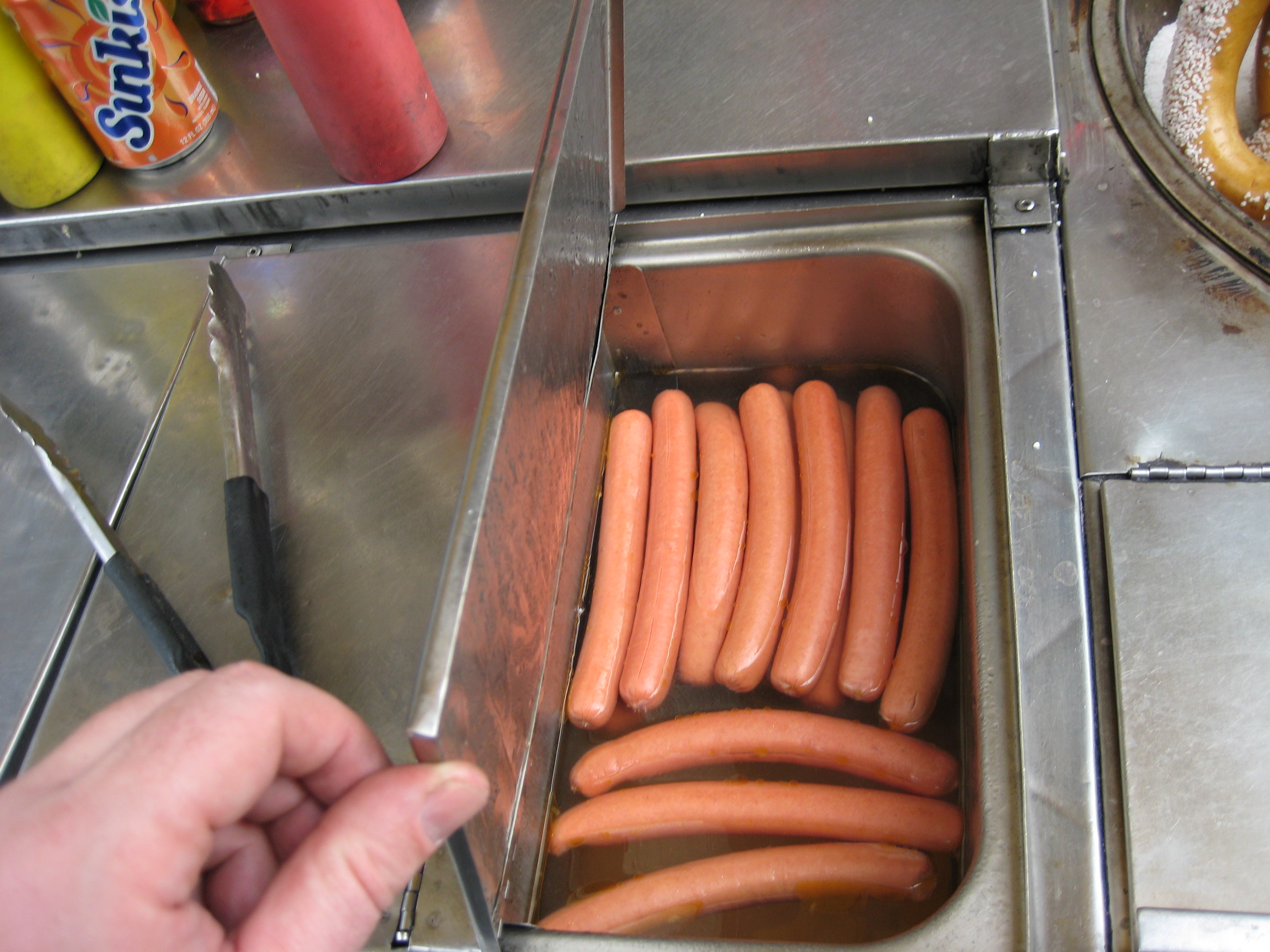
A hot dog cart's hot dogs in heated water

A hot dog cart is generally a compact cart, fully self-contained and designed to serve a limited menu. The hot dogs are often kept hot within a pan of hot water, and some refer to them as "dirty water dogs" per this method. An on-board cooler is used to keep the hot dogs safely chilled until ready for reheating. It also provides cold storage for beverages, such as sodas, and multiple sinks for washing and cleaning utensils.

Most hot dog carts use propane to heat the foods, making them independent of electrical power. Some carts may also be fitted with a propane grill, griddle, deep fryer, or other such cooking appliance. A colorful umbrella is often installed to protect the food preparation area from contamination, provide some shade, and advertise the cart's location.

== Construction ==
Hot dog carts are generally built from materials that resist corrosion, are hygiene friendly, and are easy to clean. They are often made of stainless steel, but some carts also have components made from plastic, wood, or fiberglass. The food preparation body of the cart is often mounted on a chassis that can be easily towed to a vendor's location by a vehicle, or pushed to a location by hand. Types of carts may vary from a lightweight push cart of only about 200 lbs (90 kg), to fully enclosed walk-in carts weighing 1/2 a ton or more.

== Permitted sale items ==
Although hot dog carts can be equipped to cook a variety of other meats and foods from fresh or raw states, local health code regulations in the U.S. and Canada governing food safety and the types of food that can be sold from mobile food stands usually limit hot dog carts to selling reheated pre-cooked wieners and sausages. These health code regulations vary widely from state to state and county to county.

Health regulations often limit what side dishes, condiments, and garnishes may be sold from a mobile food cart, which are potentially hazardous foods, foods at high risk for spoilage due to rapid bacterial growth at certain temperatures. For example, and it is rarely done, but some stands may offer eggs and dairy products. Meats that are considered to be hazardous, such as pork and poultry, may be banned from sale at mobile foods stands. Bacon Wrapped dogs are typically forbidden. A common workaround is offering pre-cooked bacon bits as a condiment. Hot dogs are only served on buns with certain approved condiments such as, but not limited to: mustards, pickles, pickled relishes, chopped onions, and tomato ketchup.

== Health regulations ==
Health code regulations are usually dictated by county health departments, and as a result, they vary widely across the United States and Canada. In addition to determining what types of foods are allowed to be served, these local codes often specify mandates of what equipment should be installed on a mobile food cart. Such codes also ensure that the food cart has built-in facilities for achieving appropriate hygiene levels for the cart, the equipment and utensils being used, and the operator handling the food. This may include hot and cold running water, an insulated ice box, and a number of separate sinks for washing hands and utensils.

Some areas specify that a cart have as many as four of these sinks. Local health codes may require the cart to be physically inspected by the local health department, and that a cart operator attend a training course in safe food handling and preparation. This is why, when planning to start operating a hot dog cart, the first thing one should do is to contact the local health department and ask for the person in charge of restaurant inspections. This is the person that will tell you the features you can and cannot have on your cart.

== Manufacturing and sales ==
Although the hot dog is considered an American food invention dating back to New York in the late 19th century, cart manufacturers ship hot dog carts all around the world, including Europe, Asia, South America, and the Middle East.

== See also ==
- Hot dog stand
- List of hot dog restaurants
- Pølsevogn
