= Irving Naxon =

Inventor of the slow cooker

- Born: Irving Nachumsohn; February 26, 1902; Jersey City, New Jersey, U.S.
- Died: 22 September 1989 (aged 87); Evanston, Illinois, U.S.
- Occupations: Inventor, proprietor, telegraphist
- Employer(s): Canadian Pacific Railway; Western Electric
- Works: Slow cooker

Irving Naxon (February 26, 1902 – September 22, 1989) was an American inventor, who is most famous for inventing and patenting the slow cooker. Naxon was also the first Jewish engineer who worked for Western Electric.

His archive resides at the Smithsonian Institution. Examples of his kitchen appliance inventions are held as are his papers, including his "idea book" from the 1920s, patents, early correspondence with Teletype Corporation, World War II communication regarding his invention of super sonar submarine detectors, and his impact on the sign environs of Times Square in New York City.

== Personal life ==
Naxon was born in 1902 in Jersey City, New Jersey with the birth name Israel Nachumsohn. His mother, Tamamra (Maary) had immigrated to the United States from Lithuania, via London. A 1950 advertisement shows a slow cooker called the "Simmer Crock" made by the Industrial Radiant Heat Corp. of Gladstone, NJ. His father Julius died when he was two years old. He had two siblings, an older brother, Meyer, and an older sister, Sadie. After his father's death, his family moved from Jersey City to Fargo, North Dakota, and then to Winnipeg, Manitoba. Naxon's mother moved him and his siblings to Winnipeg so that her oldest son, Meyer, could avoid the World War I draft. While in Canada, Naxon studied electrical engineering through a correspondence course. He moved back to Chicago sometime after. He married his wife Fern in 1940 and they had three daughters, Jewel, Eileen, and Lenore.

In 1945, he changed his surname from Nachumsohn to Naxon due to anti-German sentiment after WWII.

== Career ==
While receiving his electrical engineering training, Naxon worked as a telegrapher for the Canadian Pacific Railway. He later moved to Chicago and became Western Electric’s first Jewish engineer. He continued working on his inventions outside of work and passed the patent bar exam because he could not afford to hire a patent attorney He founded his own company – Naxon Utilities Corporation.

Naxon was inspired to create the slow cooker by a story from his mother which told how back in her native Lithuanian town, his grandmother made a traditional Jewish stew called cholent which took several hours to cook in the oven of the local bakery. As a young girl, her mother sent her to the bakery on Friday afternoon before the Sabbath with a ceramic pot full of cholent, and she was sent to pick up the dish on Saturday after Sabbath was over. The stew cooked low and slow in the residual heat from the cooling oven, which had not been stoked during the Sabbath according to the traditional prohibition of working during the Sabbath. In 1936, he applied for a patent for the slow cooker. On January 23, 1940, he received that patent. The first iteration of Naxon's slow cooker was The Boston Beanery and later the Naxon Beanery and Flavor Crock. In 1970, Naxon retired and sold his business and his patent for the slowcooker to the Rival Company for a lump sum rather than stock. Rival Company rebranded Naxon's invention into what is now known as the Crock Pot.

In addition to the slow cooker, Naxon also invented several other appliances and has over 200 patents to his name. He invented an electric frying pan and the hula lamp, a precursor to the lava lamp. His company made washing machines and electric dryers for Sears Roebuck, Montgomery Ward and Spiegels under their private labels. He had some early patents for moving data over telephone lines which he sold to the Teletype Corporation. Another notable invention of Naxon is his TeleSign, an electronic sign that shows moving text and was the precursor to today's news ticker.

== Death ==
Naxon died on September 22, 1989, in an Evanston nursing home. At the time, he was survived by his wife, three daughters, and five grandchildren (Tamara, Margot, Abigail, Scott and Karen). After his death, a sixth grandchild was born, who in Jewish tradition, was named Ilana after him.
