= Wonderbag =

Cooking device

The Wonderbag is an insulated non-electric cooking bag designed by entrepreneur Sarah Collins and poverty activist Moshy Mathe to reduce the amount of fuel required in the cooking of food in developing countries. Instead of being placed on a stove for the entire duration of the cooking period, the food is instead initially heated to a boil (usually) and afterwards put into the Wonderbag, which acts as a thermal cooker to cook the food to completion, this makes the Wonderbag functionally identical to a haybox, making it also useful to keep the food warm. Because the food spends most of the cooking time in the Wonderbag, the overall effort and personal time needed for cooking is drastically reduced.

The Wonderbag is inspired by the Wonderbox, which is described by author Anna Pearce in 1989 to be the then well known idea of the haybox turned into polystyrene filled cushions to support the cooking in South Africa.

== History ==
The original Wonderbox was a polyester-cotton fabric bag and lid containing recycled polystyrene chips. It was designed and produced by trained patternmaker Shirley Buys (née Woodbridge) in Durban in 1976, based upon the haybox design used in her childhood in war-time England. Packaged within a corrugated cardboard box, Buys personally marketed the Wonderbox across Zululand between 1976 and 1980. Compassion of South Africa, a non-sectarian Christian action group opposing Apartheid, and Brigid Oppenheimer helped with Shirley's design and marketing, and published a comprehensive image-guided recipe book to help illiterate users follow the recipes. The design was deliberately unpatented, with Compassion of South Africa asking to be recognised with the distribution of the recipe book. Buys manufactured the Wonderbox in her workshop in her Morningside Durban home for over 3 years before Compassion of South Africa established several manufacturing facilities across South Africa, and shared the design freely.

South African entrepreneur Sarah Collins developed the idea for the Wonderbag during power outages in South Africa in 2008.

As of January 2012, over 150,000 Wonderbags were in use in South Africa, with the manufacturers and partners such as Unilever intending to promote their use worldwide. As of January 2013 over 650,000 have been distributed in "South Africa, Rwanda, Kenya, and Syrian refugee camps in Jordan." In 2022, over 2,500 Wonderbags were donated to two Ukrainian nonprofits in an effort to provide support during the ongoing conflict with Russia. They have also worked to send them as aid to Gaza, Lebanon, Sudan, Haiti, Burkina Faso, and Jordan.

== Design ==
The Wonderbag consists of an inner layer of insulation containing recycled polystyrene foam with an outer drawstring and a covering of polyester-cotton blend textiles. The manufacturers expect that in time, the polystyrene will be replaced with a biodegradable polyurethane blend.

== Use ==
To use the Wonderbag, a cooking pot is heated on a stove until it reaches the required cooking temperature. At this point, the pot is removed from the stove and placed in the bag, where the pot remains at nearly cooking temperature for the rest of the cooking duration. For example, rice requires about one hour in the Wonderbag, while a meat dish requires around five hours after the initial boiling.

== Fuel savings ==
The Wonderbag is estimated to save up to 30% of the total fuel costs (often Kerosene (paraffin) or wood) associated with cooking and thus helps to reduce deforestation.

Due to the fuel reduction, the Wonderbag is estimated to reduce carbon dioxide emissions by up to half a ton per year if used three times a week.

== Retail and production ==
The Wonderbag is produced and sold in South Africa, but also sold internationally using the buy-one give-one model.
