= Critical control point =

Food safety procedure

In food safety, the Critical Control Point (CCP) is the point where the failure of Standard Operation Procedure (SOP) could cause harm to customers and to the business, or even loss of the business itself. It is a point, step or procedure at which controls can be applied and a food safety hazard can be prevented, eliminated or reduced to acceptable (critical) levels. The most common CCP is cooking, where food safety managers designate critical limits. CCP identification is also an important step in risk and reliability analysis for water treatment processes.

== Food in cooking ==
In the United States, the Food and Drug Administration (FDA) establishes minimum internal temperatures for cooked foods. These values can be superseded by state or local health code requirements, but they cannot be below the FDA limits. Temperatures should be measured with a probe thermometer in the thickest part of meats, or the center of other dishes, avoiding bones and container sides. Minimum internal temperatures are set as follows:

165 °F (74 °C) for 15 seconds

- Poultry (such as whole or ground chicken, turkey, or duck)
- Stuffed meats, fish, poultry, and pasta
- Any previously cooked foods that are reheated from a temperature below 135 °F (57 °C), provided they have been refrigerated or warm less than 2 hours
- Any potentially hazardous foods cooked in a microwave, such as poultry, meat, fish, or eggs

155 °F (68 °C) for 15 seconds

- Ground meats (such as beef or pork)
- Injected meats (such as flavor-injected roasts or brined hams)
- Ground or minced fish
- Eggs that will be held for a length of time before eaten

145 °F (63 °C) for 15 seconds

- Steaks and chops such as beef, pork, veal, and lamb
- Fish
- Eggs cooked for immediate service

145 °F (63 °C) for 4 minutes

- Roasts (can be cooked to lower temperatures for increased lengths of time)

135 °F (57 °C) for 15 seconds

- Cooked fruits or vegetables that will be held for a length of time before eaten
- Any commercially processed, ready-to-eat foods that will be held for a length of time before eaten

In addition, hot food must be held at a minimum interval of 135 °F (57 °C) if it is not immediately consumed. The temperature must be checked every 4 hours or else labeled with a discard time. Although monitored hot food can be held indefinitely in this way without a food safety concern, the nutritional value, flavor, and quality can suffer over long periods.

== See also ==
- HACCP
- Modified atmosphere
