= National Advisory Committee on Microbiological Criteria for Foods =

Agency overview
- Formed: 1988
- Parent department: Food Safety and Inspection Service

The National Advisory Committee on Microbiological Criteria for Foods was established in 1988 to advise the Secretaries of Agriculture and Health and Human Services concerning the development of science-based, microbiological standards by which the safety of foods can be evaluated and by which plant sanitation and processing systems can be improved.

The committee's work also assists the CDC and the Departments of Commerce and Defense. The committee is the outcome of a 1985 report of the National Academy of Sciences Committee on Food Protection, Subcommittee on Microbiological Criteria.

The committee has published reports on a variety of issues related to foods and pathogens, ranging from Salmonella Control Strategies in Poultry to the microbiological safety of sprouted seeds. A full list of reports and recommendations from the committee can be found in the committee's website.

As of 2020, the committee consists of members with diverse backgrounds and expertise.. Current members as of August 2020 are:

Dr. Gary Acuff, Texas A&M University, College Station, TX

Mr. Aaron Asmus, Hormel Foods Corporate Services, LLC Austin, MN

Dr. Vanessa Coffman, Keep Antibiotics Working Coalition Baltimore, MD

Dr. Peggy Cook, TriStrata Group Springdale, AR

Ms. DeAnn Davis, Church Brothers Farms Salinas, CA

Dr. James Dickson, Iowa State University Ames, IA

Dr. Francisco Diez-Gonzalez, University of Georgia Griffin, GA

Dr. Joseph Eifert, Virginia Tech Blacksburg, VA

Dr. Philip Elliott, Kellogg Company Battle Creek, MI

Dr. Kathleen Glass, University of Wisconsin-Madison Madison, WI

Dr. Carolyn Hovde, University of Idaho Moscow, ID

Dr. Lee-Ann Jaykus, North Carolina State University Raleigh, NC

Dr. Mohammad Koohmaraie, IEH Laboratories & Consulting Group Lake Forest Park, WA

Dr. Bala Kottapalli, Conagra Brands Omaha, NE

Dr. Margie Lee, Virginia Tech Blacksburg, VA

Ms. Patty Lewandowski, Florida Department of Health Tallahassee, FL

Dr. Evelyne Mbandi, U.S. Department of Agriculture, Food Safety and Inspection Service Washington, DC

Dr. Wendy McMahon, Silliker, Inc. Crete, IL

Dr. Angela Melton-Celsa, Uniformed Services University of the Health Sciences Bethesda, MD

Dr. Haley Oliver, Purdue University West Lafayette, IN

Dr. Omar Oyarzabal, University of Vermont St. Albans, VT

Dr. Laurie Post, Deibel Laboratories Long Valley, NJ

Dr. John Ruby, Passport Food Safety Solutions West Des Moines, IA

Ms. Angela Ruple, U.S. Department of Commerce National Seafood Inspection Laboratory Pascagoula, MS

Ms. Jenny Scott, Food and Drug Administration Center for Food Safety & Applied Nutrition College Park, MD

Dr. Scott Stillwell, Tyson Foods, Inc. Springdale, AR

Dr. Robert Tauxe, Centers for Disease Control and Prevention Atlanta, GA

Dr. Valentina Trinetta, Kansas State University Manhattan, KS

Col. Alisa Wilma, Department of Defense Fort Lee, VA

Dr. Francisco Zagmutt, EpiX Analytics Fort Collins, CO
