= Carryover cooking =

Cooking technique

Carryover cooking (sometimes referred to as resting) is when foods are halted from actively cooking and allowed to equilibrate under their own retained heat. Because foods such as meats are typically measured for cooking temperature near the center of mass, stopping cooking at a given central temperature means that the outer layers of the food will be at higher temperature than that measured. Heat therefore will continue to migrate inwards from the surface, and the food will cook further even after being removed from the source of heat.

Carryover cooking is often used as a finishing step in preparation of foods that are roasted or grilled, and should be accounted for in recipes as it can increase the internal temperature of foods by temperatures between 5 and 25 degrees Fahrenheit (3–14°C). The larger and denser the object being heated, the greater the amount of temperature increase due to carryover cooking.

Resting, when used as a synonym for carryover cooking, also refers to the process of allowing the liquids in meats to redistribute through the food over a 5- to 20-minute period. It is a common belief that this allows for a more flavorful and juicy finished product, in contrast to immediately cutting meat and allowing the still mobile juices to be lost from the meat before redistribution. Recent food research suggests however that resting doesn't directly impact flavor/juciness, although it does allow for greater temperature control (and cutting at the right temperature results in juicier meat).

== Physics ==
Because larger objects have a lower surface-area-to-volume ratio, they are more able to retain heat. This heat retention translates to a uniform temperature increase throughout the food as the heat dissipates to cooler areas. Additionally, foods with a higher water content are more subject to carry over cooking as water has a higher heat capacity and will have more heat to distribute throughout the food item.
