= Potentially Hazardous Food =

Foods that spoil quickly without time-temperature control

Potentially Hazardous Food is a term used by food safety organizations to classify foods that require time-temperature control to keep them safe for human consumption. A PHF is a food that:

- Contains moisture – usually regarded as a water activity greater than 0.85
- Contains protein
- Is neutral to slightly acidic – typically having a pH between 4.6 and 7.5

== US FDA Definition ==
Potentially Hazardous Food has been redefined by the US Food and Drug Administration in the 2013 FDA Food Code to Time/Temperature Control for Safety Food. Pages 22 and 23 (pdf pages 54 and 55), state the following:

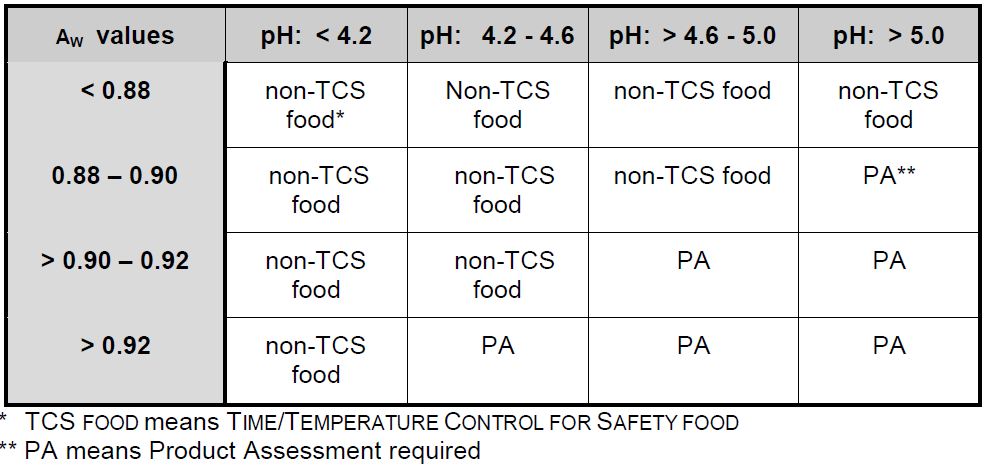
PHF table A 2013 FDA Food Code.

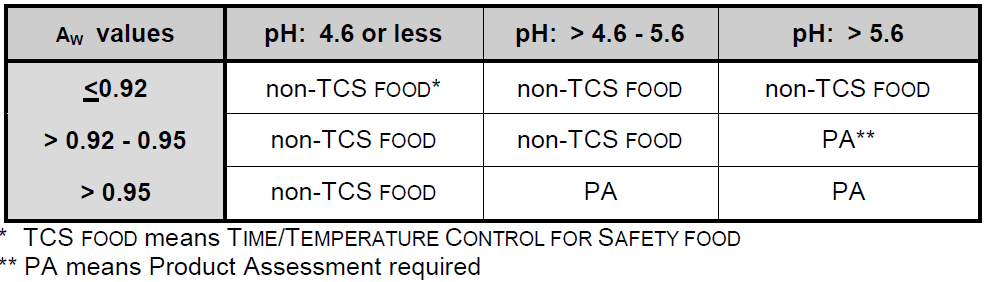
PHF table B 2013 FDA Food Code.

- "Time/temperature control for safety food" means a FOOD that requires time/temperature control for safety (TCS) to limit pathogenic microorganism growth or toxin formation.
- "Time/temperature control for safety food" includes:
  - An animal FOOD that is raw or heat-treated; a plant FOOD that is heat-treated or consists of raw seed sprouts, cut melons, cut leafy greens, cut tomatoes or mixtures of cut tomatoes that are not modified in a way so that they are unable to support pathogenic microorganism growth or toxin formation, or garlic-in-oil mixtures that are not modified in a way so that they are unable to support pathogenic microorganism growth or toxin formation; and
  - Except as specified in Subparagraph (3)(d) of this definition, a FOOD that because of the interaction of its A_{W} and pH values is designated as Product Assessment Required (PA) in Table A or B of this definition:
- "Time/temperature control for safety food" does not include:
  - An air-cooled hard-boiled EGG with shell intact, or an EGG with shell intact that is not hard-boiled, but has been pasteurized to destroy all viable salmonellae;
  - A FOOD in an unopened HERMETICALLY SEALED CONTAINER that is commercially processed to achieve and maintain commercial sterility under conditions of non-refrigerated storage and distribution;
  - A FOOD that because of its pH or A_{W} value, or interaction of A_{W} and pH values, is designated as a non-TCS FOOD in Table A or B of this definition;
  - A FOOD that is designated as Product Assessment Required (PA) in Table A or B of this definition and has undergone a Product Assessment showing that the growth or toxin formation of pathogenic microorganisms that are reasonably likely to occur in that FOOD is precluded due to:
    - Intrinsic factors including added or natural characteristics of the FOOD such as preservatives, antimicrobials, humectants, acidulants, or nutrients,
    - Extrinsic factors including environmental or operational factors that affect the FOOD such as packaging, modified atmosphere such as REDUCED OXYGEN PACKAGING, shelf life and use, or temperature range of storage and use, or
    - A combination of intrinsic and extrinsic factors; or
  - A FOOD that does not support the growth or toxin formation of pathogenic microorganisms.

== For More Information ==
The 2013 FDA Food Code, FDA HACCP Manual, USDA HACCP Manual, FSIF Meat and Poultry Product Hazards and Control Guides, and the Food Safety Modernization Act FDA Food Safety Modernization Act, provide detailed information on Time and Temperature controls for food safety.

== Australia PHF Information ==
In Australia, Food Standards Australia New Zealand (FSANZ) defines potentially hazardous food to mean food that has to be kept at certain temperatures to minimize the growth of any pathogenic microorganisms that may be present in the food or to prevent the formation of toxins in the food.

Under Australian regulations, the following are examples of potentially hazardous foods:

- Raw and cooked meat or foods containing meat, such as casseroles, curries and lasagne;
- Dairy products, for example, milk, custard and dairy based desserts;
- Seafood (excluding live seafood);
- Processed fruits and vegetables, for example, salads;
- Cooked rice and pasta;
- Foods containing eggs, beans, nuts or other protein rich foods, such as quiche and soy products;
- Foods that contain these foods, such as sandwiches and rolls.
