= Kristin Luck =

American businesswoman

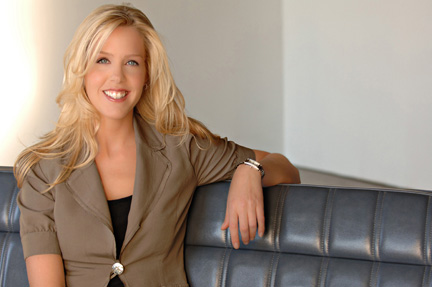
Kristin Luck

Kristin Luck is an American businesswoman. She is a consultant and public speaker, specializing in nontraditional marketing and branding strategies. Prior to launching her own practice, she was company president and CMO (Chief Marketing Officer) of Decipher, a marketing research services provider. She originally took the role in 2007 after Decipher acquired her start-up, Forefront Consulting Group. Decipher was acquired by FocusVision in 2015.

Luck joined ACNielsen to assist in the development of digital rights management. She later co-founded Online Testing Exchange (OTX), an online market research firm. OTX was acquired in January 2004 and she left in December 2005 to start research services company Forefront Consulting Group; Forefront was acquired in June 2007 by Decipher.

She is the founder of the group Women in Research, a networking group, for women in marketing research to facilitate networking, leadership, entrepreneurship and other career development goals.

Luck lectures at industry conferences for groups such as the Advertising Research Foundation, the Council of American Survey Research Organizations and the Marketing Research Association.

She was the ESOMAR president for the 2021/22 year

In 2023, she co-founded Growgetter, a new growth marketing firm that specializes in the market research field.
