= Master of Marketing Research =

The Master of Marketing Research (MMR) is a graduate degree program that may be from one to three years in length. Students pursuing this degree study the aspects of research in the field of marketing. Unlike an M.B.A., which is a general business degree, the Master of Marketing Research focuses solely on the aspects of marketing research.

== History ==
The first Master of Marketing Research was developed by the Terry College of Business, University of Georgia in 1979. Marketing faculty, together with leading marketing research professionals, developed a curriculum that "was designed to develop marketing research professionals of the highest caliber and thereby satisfy a critical need of U.S. business."

== Master of Marketing Research degree ==
Generally, a Master of Marketing Research combines classroom work with real-world research opportunities and special projects. Courses stress practical application to real-world marketing research problems, rather than the theoretical application suggested in most bachelor's business degrees.

These degrees give specific instruction on research methodology, variable coding, and database construction and management. Classroom topics might include database management, focus group development, statistics in marketing, and consumer behavior.

=== Different Program Titles ===
The Master of Marketing Research (M.M.R) may also be known as the Master of Science in Marketing Research (M.S.M.R.) or Master of Science in Marketing Analytics (M.S.M.A.). Similar in nature to the Master of Marketing Research is a Master of Business Administration with an emphasis in marketing research. In Europe, the degree is known as Master in Market Research and Consumer Behavior at IE University/IE Business School and as Master of Marketing Analysis at Ghent University. In Canada, the degree is known as Master of Business-Marketing/Analysis. In Australia, the degree is known as Master of Business in Marketing Research (M.B.M.R.) at Edith Cowan University, and as Master of Marketing (M.Mrkt.) at the University of Tasmania.

=== Curriculum ===
The curriculum of a Marketing Research program requires students without a business background to complete prerequisites that address this deficiency. These are followed by a series of core classes and electives. Some programs are lockstep programs, in which students follow a fixed sequence of courses. Other programs are open, allowing students to select their own courses. The courses are mainly divided into two categories: qualitative and quantitative.

=== Qualitative ===
Qualitative research consists of in-depth interviews (IDIs) as well as focus groups. Qualitative research mainly focuses on the cognitive and social psychological aspects of marketing research. Its main priority is understanding the thought process rather than analyzing it.

=== Quantitative ===
Quantitative research mainly deals with the application of bivariate and multivariate statistics to marketing research. IBM SPSS is the most widely used tool for data analysis, though some companies prefer to use Excel and WinCross. Industrial application of statistics is limited to cross- tabulations using chi- square estimation, but some companies use linear and logistic regression analysis. More recently, conjoint analysis has become popular for its application to product bundling and pricing.

Quantitative research is applied to ad hoc and tracking studies; it is mainly primary research using a variety of methods and analysis techniques.

Type of Quantitative Studies

Concept testing, Copy testing, Customer experience study, Pricing study, Product testing, Brand awareness, Market segmentation, and Trade-off analysis

Quantitative Techniques

MaxDiff (Concept testing with monadic randomization), CSat and NPS score (Customer experience study), Van Westendorp pricing (Pricing study), Conjoint analysis (CBC) (Trade-off analysis), and Two-step cluster and K-means cluster analysis (Market segmentation)

Advanced Data Analysis Techniques (Not to get confused with data analytics)

Driver analysis (Linear regression), Factor analysis (EFA), and Perceptual mapping

== Recent trends affecting marketing research education ==
Job specialization is one of the recent trends affecting marketing research education. There is evidence that modern professional jobs are being disaggregated and becoming increasingly specialized. While management of the marketing mix is expected to continue to be overseen by generalists broadly trained in business and/or marketing, this trend towards specialization is creating new opportunities for professionals with focal training in the area of market research and the closely related area of consumer behaviour. In the United States, jobs in market and survey research were projected to grow to 350,500 by 2018, compared with 197,500 jobs for marketing managers, 43,900 jobs for advertising and promotion managers and 64,100 jobs for public relations managers. These two trends—specialization of professional jobs, and demand in the labor market for market research specialists—suggest an increasing importance for post-graduate training designed to provide a gateway for university graduates seeking careers in market research and consumer behavior.

Consumer behavior research by behavioral and neural scientists continues to contribute to the understanding of human decision making, and its findings influence the nature of marketing and market research. As companies contend with "big data" and social media such as Twitter and Facebook, they face increasing challenges in collecting, analyzing and interpreting this data to better understand their customers. This suggests that consumer behavior and customer insight will likely play an increasing role in the work of market researchers.

== Careers in marketing research ==
Careers in marketing research are divided mainly into two types: supplier organizations and client organizations. Supplier- side jobs are consulting jobs that are similar in nature to management consulting jobs. Nielsen Corporation, formerly known as AC Nielsen, is the biggest supplier in the business, followed by Kantar Group, Ipsos, GfK and others.

Supplier organization

Supplier organizations serve multiple industry domains, and MR graduates working in them focus on multiple domains. Research is designed and executed according to client requirements. Most MR graduates in these organizations work as statisticians, analysts, account executives, field work directors and in similar roles.

Client organization

Client organizations are single- domain organizations, where MR graduates focus entirely on a single industry. Organizations that recruit MR graduates include those in telecom, food processing, aviation, retail chains and media. Positions for which they recruit include director, assistant research director, senior analyst and analyst. Many supplier- side consultants seek full-time employment with the clients they advised during their tenure in the supplier organization.

== Job & Placements Scenarios ==
With the increase in demand for marketing researchers, there has been a rise in the number of jobs available in research. An increasing number of suppliers has also increased the number of positions available. Most placements take place through alumni networks, which help candidates secure jobs before graduation. Most companies recruit US citizens, but very few recruit international candidates because of visa sponsorship requirements. Other reasons include the qualitative nature of research work and the abundance of available resources for recruitment.

== Certifications ==
=== Professional Certified Marketer (PCM) ===
Professional Certified Marketer (PCM) is a certification offered by the American Marketing Association (AMA). AMA is an American organization based in Chicago, Illinois. The certification requires a candidate to pass a comprehensive exam and must be renewed every three years through continuing education.

=== Professional Researcher Certification (PRC) ===
Professional Researcher Certification (PRC) is a certification offered by the Marketing Research Association (MRA). MRA is an American organization based in Washington, DC. The certification tests a candidate's knowledge of current marketing research practices and understanding of marketing research issues. It requires a candidate to pass an exam of 100 multiple-choice and true/false questions, and must be renewed every two years through continuing education.

=== Master Moderator Certificate Program (MMCP) ===
The RIVA Master Moderator Certificate is a certification offered by the RIVA Market Research and Training Institute, based in Rockville, MD. The certificate is awarded to those who complete training in a series of courses, workshops, and private work, and who demonstrate their skills and knowledge before an examination panel through written and practicum examinations as well as a personal interview. To qualify, candidates must have conducted a minimum of 200 qualitative research events (QREs), such as focus groups, in-depth interviews, ethnographies/in-home interviews and online bulletin boards/focus groups, and must pass the RIVA Master Moderator Certificate written examination and practicum.

== Programs of US ==
=== The University of Georgia: MMR Program ===
Started in 1979, the MMR program at the University of Georgia was the first marketing research program in the US. It is an 11-month cohort program that starts every summer (June) and ends in May. A total of 39 credit hours are required to complete the program. As a cohort program, it follows a lock-step sequence of courses taken by the whole incoming class, which starts and graduates at the same time. The program has reported a 100% placement rate for domestic (US) students. Funding is provided in two forms: graduate assistantships, which include a full tuition waiver and monthly stipend, and out-of-state tuition waivers. The program accepts both GMAT and GRE scores, and the class size is restricted to 30. The University of Georgia is a Tier 1 institution per U.S. News & World Report.

=== University of Wisconsin: MBA-MR Program ===
The University of Wisconsin at Madison offers a specialization in marketing research in its MBA program. The specialization is supported by the A.C. Nielsen center for marketing research, which was founded in 1990 as a part of the business school. The program has only fall entry and follows the general full-time MBA application cycle. An internship is an integral part of the program, which reports a 100% internship placement rate and a 94% full-time placement rate.

=== The University of Texas at Arlington: MSMR Program ===
The MSMR program at The University of Texas at Arlington was founded in 1990. The program has connections with corporations in the Southwest, particularly in the Dallas–Fort Worth area. It was one of the first three such programs. It is a 24-month cohort program with a flexible sequence of courses and multiple choices of electives, allowing each candidate to select courses according to their requirements. The program has reserved funding for MSMR students, including graduate teaching assistantships that cover only out-of-state tuition and pay a monthly stipend.

=== University of Maryland-College Park: MS and PhD - Survey Methodology Program ===
The Joint Program in Survey Methodology (JPSM) is the nation's oldest and largest program offering graduate training in the principles and practices of survey research. Founded in 1993, it is sponsored by the Federal Interagency Consortium on Statistical Policy and is housed in The College of Behavioral and Social Sciences at the University of Maryland.

=== Michigan State University: MSMR Program ===
Founded in 2011, the MSMR program at Michigan State University is the only one of the " big four" programs to offer a dual format. The full-time program is a 12-month program with a required internship, while the online program is a 19-month program. The program does not offer scholarships or other funding to students. The full-time program has spring and fall entry.

== Schools offering Masters in Marketing Research (or equivalent) ==
=== Europe ===
- Aston University - Birmingham, England
- Ghent University - Ghent, Belgium
- IE University / IE Business School, Madrid, Spain
- Tilburg University - Tilburg, Netherlands
- James I University - Castellón de la Plana, Spain
- University of Edinburgh - Edinburgh, UK
- University of Barcelona - Barcelona, Spain

=== USA: Marketing Research Programs (MMR & MSMR) ===
- Southern Illinois University Edwardsville - Edwardsville, Illinois
- Michigan State University- East Lansing, Michigan
- University of Georgia - Athens, Georgia
- The University of Texas at Arlington - Arlington, Texas
- Hofstra University - Hempstead, New York
- Temple University - Philadelphia, Pennsylvania
- Pacific Lutheran University - Tacoma, Washington

=== USA: Marketing/ Customer Analytics Programs ===
- Bentley University, Waltham, Massachusetts
- DePaul University - Chicago, Illinois
- University of Maryland -College Park, Maryland
- Illinois Institute of Technology -Chicago, Illinois
- Pace University -New York City, New York
- Washington University in St. Louis -St. Louis, Missouri
- Fordham University -New York City, New York
- University of Rochester -Rochester, New York
- Aurora University -Aurora, Illinois
- Michigan State University- East Lansing, Michigan
- Southern New Hampshire University -Manchester, New Hampshire

=== USA: MBA with concentration Marketing Research/ Intelligence/ Analytics Programs ===
- University of Wisconsin- Madison, Wisconsin
- University of Texas- Austin, Texas
- Rutgers- Newark, New Jersey
- Rochester Institute of Technology- Rochester, New York
- University of Connecticut- Storrs, Connecticut

=== USA: Special Graduate Programs Related to Marketing Research ===
- Cuny Baruch College- New York City, New York
- University of Connecticut- Storrs, Connecticut
- University of Nebraska–Lincoln- Lincoln, Nebraska
- University of Michigan- Ann Arbor, Michigan
- University of Maryland- College Park, Maryland
- The University of Texas at Dallas- Richardson, Texas

=== Canada ===
- University of Guelph- Ontario, Canada

== See also ==
- Macromarketing
- Marketing Research
- Marketing
- Consumer Behaviour
- Customer insight
- Academic degree
- Qualitative marketing research
- Quantitative marketing research
