= ISO 20252 =

Standard

ISO 20252:2019 is an international standard for a quality management system for organizations conducting market, opinion and social research.

Developed by an ISO Technical Committee in liaison with professional bodies EFAMRO, ESOMAR and WAPOR, the standard was first published in 2006 as a replacement for the existing British Standards BS 7911:2003. It was subsequently revised in 2012, and then restructured and technically revised in its third edition of 2019. The standard has been restructured, with a core clause (Clause 4) applicable to all service providers, regardless of methodologies provided, and six separate annexes (Annexes A to F), each covering requirements relating to one of the globally-recognized research methodologies.

== Certified organizations ==
In the UK the Market Research Society (a member of the EFAMRO which sits on the ISO liaison committee) reports that 69 organizations (not counting subsidiaries) are certified to the standard:

The Council of American Survey Research Organizations (CASRO) has passed 17 organizations through its ISO 20252 certification scheme:

In Japan, Japan Management Association Quality Assurance Registration Center (JMAQA) has certified 8 organizations to the ISO 20252 standard. :

In Austria, Germany and Switzerland, AS International, headquartered in Vienna, have certified so far 14 market research companies to ISO 20252 via its mandated ISO auditing entity https://www.attersee-consulting.com. Updates can be obtained from https://www.ISO20252.global. AS International also represents the joint ISO 20252 expert committee for AT, DE and CH.
