= Marketing research =

Branch of research for business management

Marketing research is a systematic gathering, recording, and analysis of qualitative and quantitative data about issues relating to marketing products and services. The goal is to identify and assess how changing elements of the marketing mix impacts customer behavior.

This involves employing a data-driven marketing approach to specify the data required to address these issues, then designing a method for collecting the information and implementing the data collection process. After analyzing the collected data, the results and findings, including their implications, are forwarded to those empowered to act on them.

Market research, marketing research, and marketing are a sequence of business activities; sometimes these are handled informally.

The field of marketing research is much older than that of market research. Although both involve consumers, Marketing research is concerned specifically with marketing processes, such as advertising effectiveness and salesforce effectiveness, while market research is concerned specifically with markets and distribution. Two explanations given for confusing market research with marketing research are the similarity of the terms and the fact that market research is a subset of marketing research. Further confusion exists because of major companies with expertise and practices in both areas.

== Overview ==
Marketing research is often partitioned into two sets of categorical pairs, either by target market:

- Direct or Business-to-consumer (B2C) marketing research, and
- Business-to-business (B2B) marketing research.

Or, alternatively, by methodological approach:

- Qualitative marketing research, and
- Quantitative marketing research.

Consumer marketing research is a form of applied sociology that concentrates on understanding the preferences, attitudes, and behaviors of consumers in a market-based economy, and it aims to understand the effects and comparative success of marketing campaigns.

Thus, marketing research may also be described as the systematic and objective identification, collection, analysis, and dissemination of information, for the purpose of assisting management in decision-making related to the identification and solution of problems and opportunities in marketing. The goal of market research is to obtain and provide management with viable information about the market (e.g., competitors), consumers, the product/service itself etc.

== Role ==
The purpose of marketing research (MR) is to provide management with relevant, accurate, reliable, valid, and up-to-date market information.

The decisions made by marketing managers are complicated by interactions between the controllable marketing variables of product, pricing, promotion, and distribution. Further complications are added by uncontrollable environmental factors such as general economic conditions, technology, public policies and laws, political environment, competition, and social and cultural changes. Marketing research helps the marketing manager link the marketing variables with the environment and the consumers by providing relevant information. In the absence of relevant information, consumers' response to marketing programs cannot be predicted reliably or accurately.

== History ==
Evidence for commercial research being gathered informally dates to the Medieval period. In 1380, the German textile manufacturer, Johann Fugger, travelled from Augsburg to Graben in order to gather information on the international textile industry. He exchanged detailed letters on trade conditions in relevant areas. Although, this type of information would have been termed "commercial intelligence" at the time, it created a precedent for the systemic collection of marketing information.

During the European age of discovery, industrial houses began to import exotic, luxury goods - calico cloth from India, porcelain, silk and tea from China, spices from India and South-East Asia and tobacco, sugar, rum and coffee from the New World. International traders began to demand information that could be used for marketing decisions. During this period, Daniel Defoe, a London merchant, published information on trade and economic resources of England and Scotland. Defoe was a prolific publisher and among his many publications are titles devoted to the state of trade including; Trade of Britain Stated, (1707); Trade of Scotland with France, (1713) and The Trade to India Critically and Calmly Considered, (1720) - all of which provided merchants and traders with important information on which to base business decisions.

Until the late 18th century, European and North-American economies were characterised by local production and consumption. Produce, household goods, and tools were produced by local artisans or farmers, with exchange taking place in local markets or fairs. Under these conditions, the need for marketing information was minimal. However, the rise of mass production following the Industrial Revolution, combined with improved transportation systems in the early 19th century, led to the creation of national markets and ultimately stimulated the need for more detailed information about customers, competitors, distribution systems, and market communications.

By the 19th-century, manufacturers were exploring ways to understand the different market needs and behaviours of groups of consumers. A study of the German book trade found examples of both product differentiation and market segmentation as early as the 1820s. From the 1880s, German toy manufacturers were producing models of tin toys for specific geographic markets; London omnibuses and ambulances destined for the British market; French postal delivery vans for Continental Europe and American locomotives intended for sale in America. Such activities suggest that sufficient market information was collected to support detailed market segmentation.

In 1895, American advertising agency, N. H. Ayer & Son, used telegraph to contact publishers and state officials throughout the country about grain production, in an effort to construct an advertising schedule for client, Nichols-Shephard company, an agricultural machinery company in what many scholars believe is the first application of marketing research to solve a marketing/ advertising problem)

Between 1902 and 1910, George B Waldron, working at Mahin's Advertising Agency in the United States used tax registers, city directories and census data to show advertisers the proportion of educated vs illiterate consumers and the earning capacity of different occupations in a very early example of simple market segmentation. In 1911 Charles Coolidge Parlin was appointed as the Manager of the Commercial Research Division of the Advertising Department of the Curtis Publishing Company, thereby establishing the first in-house market research department - an event that has been described as marking the beginnings of organised marketing research. His aim was to turn market research into a science. Parlin published a number of studies of various product-markets including agriculture (1911); consumer goods (c.1911); department store lines (1912) a five-volume study of automobiles (1914).

In 1924 Paul Cherington improved on primitive forms of demographic market segmentation when he developed the 'ABCD' household typology; the first socio-demographic segmentation tool. By the 1930s, market researchers such as Ernest Dichter recognised that demographics alone were insufficient to explain different marketing behaviours and began exploring the use of lifestyles, attitudes, values, beliefs and culture to segment markets.

In the first three decades of the 20th century, advertising agencies and marketing departments developed the basic techniques used in quantitative and qualitative research – survey methods, questionnaires, gallup polls etc. As early as 1901, Walter B Scott was undertaking experimental research for the Agate Club of Chicago. In 1910, George B Waldron was carrying out qualitative research for Mahins Advertising Agency. In 1919, the first book on commercial research was published, Commercial Research: An Outline of Working Principles by Professor C.S. Duncan of the University of Chicago.

Adequate knowledge of consumer preferences was a key to survival in the face of increasingly competitive markets. By the 1920s, advertising agencies, such as J Walter Thompson (JWT), were conducting research on the how and why consumers used brands, so that they could recommend appropriate advertising copy to manufacturers.

The advent of commercial radio in the 1920s, and television in the 1940s, led a number of market research companies to develop the means to measure audience size and audience composition. In 1923, Arthur Nielsen founded market research company, A C Nielsen and over next decade pioneered the measurement of radio audiences. He subsequently applied his methods to the measurement of television audiences. Around the same time, Daniel Starch developed measures for testing advertising copy effectiveness in print media (newspapers and magazines), and these subsequently became known as Starch scores (and are still used today).

During, the 1930s and 1940s, many of the data collection methods, probability sampling methods, survey methods, questionnaire design and key metrics were developed. By the 1930s, Ernest Dichter was pioneering the focus group method of qualitative research. For this, he is often described as the 'father of market research.' Dichter applied his methods on campaigns for major brands including Chrysler, Exxon/Esso where he used methods from psychology and cultural anthropology to gain consumer insights. These methods eventually lead to the development of motivational research. Marketing historians refer to this period as the "Foundation Age" of market research.

By the 1930s, the first courses on marketing research were taught in universities and colleges. The text-book, Market Research and Analysis by Lyndon O. Brown (1937) became one of the popular textbooks during this period. As the number of trained research professionals proliferated throughout the second half of the 20th-century, the techniques and methods used in marketing research became increasingly sophisticated. Marketers, such as Paul Green, were instrumental in developing techniques such as conjoint analysis and multidimensional scaling, both of which are used in positioning maps, market segmentation, choice analysis and other marketing applications.

Web analytics were born out of the need to track the behavior of site visitors and, as the popularity of e-commerce and web advertising grew, businesses demanded details on the information created by new practices in web data collection, such as click-through and exit rates. As the Internet boomed, websites became larger and more complex and the possibility of two-way communication between businesses and their consumers became a reality. Provided with the capacity to interact with online customers, Researchers were able to collect large amounts of data that were previously unavailable, further propelling the marketing research industry.

In the new millennium, as the Internet continued to develop and websites became more interactive, data collection and analysis became more commonplace for those marketing research firms whose clients had a web presence. With the explosive growth of the online marketplace came new competition for companies; no longer were businesses merely competing with the shop down the road — competition was now represented by a global force. Retail outlets were appearing online and the previous need for bricks-and-mortar stores was diminishing at a greater pace than online competition was growing. With so many online channels for consumers to make purchases, companies needed newer and more compelling methods, in combination with messages that resonated more effectively, to capture the attention of the average consumer.

Having access to web data did not automatically provide companies with the rationale behind the behavior of users visiting their sites, which provoked the marketing research industry to develop new and better ways of tracking, collecting and interpreting information. This led to the development of various tools like online focus groups and pop-up or website intercept surveys. These types of services allowed companies to dig deeper into the motivations of consumers, augmenting their insights and utilizing this data to drive market share.

As information around the world became more accessible, increased competition led companies to demand more from market researchers. It was no longer sufficient to follow trends in web behavior or track sales data; companies now needed access to consumer behavior throughout the entire purchase process. This meant that the marketing research industry, once again, needed to adapt to the rapidly changing needs of the marketplace and to the demands of companies looking for a competitive edge.

Marketing research has evolved alongside developments in information technology and increased access to digital data. Businesses operating in both business-to-business (B2B) and business-to-consumer (B2C) markets use quantitative and qualitative research methods to better understand target audiences and consumer behaviour.

This demand is driving marketing researchers to develop new platforms for interactive, two-way communication between their firms and consumers. Mobile devices are an example of an emerging platform that enables businesses to connect with their customers throughout the entire buying process.

As mobile devices increase in capability and use, the marketing research industry is incorporating them into data collection. Research firms use these devices to collect data on consumer impressions. Clients are requesting personalized and focused products from research firms. While large datasets are used to identify general market segments, niche market identification is used by companies for competition in the digital sector.

== Characteristics ==
First, marketing research is systematic. Thus systematic planning is required at all the stages of the marketing research process. The procedures followed at each stage are methodologically sound, well documented, and, as much as possible, planned in advance. Marketing research uses the scientific method in that data are collected and analyzed to test prior notions or hypotheses. Experts in marketing research have shown that studies featuring multiple and often competing hypotheses yield more meaningful results than those featuring only one dominant hypothesis.

Marketing research is objective. It attempts to provide accurate information that reflects a true state of affairs. It should be conducted impartially. While research is always influenced by the researcher's research philosophy, it should be free from the personal or political biases of the researcher or the management. Research which is motivated by personal or political gain involves a breach of professional standards. Such research is deliberately biased so as to result in predetermined findings. The objective nature of marketing research underscores the importance of ethical considerations. Also, researchers should always be objective with regard to the selection of information to be featured in reference texts because such literature should offer a comprehensive view on marketing. Research has shown, however, that many marketing textbooks do not feature important principles in marketing research.

== Related business research ==
Other forms of business research include:

- Market research is broader in scope and examines all aspects of a business environment, but not internal business processes. It asks questions about competitors, market structure, government regulations, economic trends, technological advances, and numerous other factors that make up the external business environment (see environmental scanning). Sometimes the term refers more particularly to the financial analysis of competing companies, industries, or sectors. In this case, financial analysts usually carry out the research and provide the results to investment advisors and potential investors.
- Product research — This looks at what products can be produced with available technology, and what new product innovations near-future technology can develop (see new product development).
- Advertising research – is a specialized form of marketing research conducted to improve the efficacy of advertising. Copy testing, also known as "pre-testing," is a form of customized research that predicts in-market performance of an ad before it airs, by analyzing audience levels of attention, brand linkage, motivation, entertainment, and communication, as well as breaking down the ad's flow of attention and flow of emotion. Pre-testing is also used on ads still in rough (ripomatic or animatic) form. (Young, p. 213)

== Classification ==
Organizations engage in marketing research for two reasons: firstly, to identify and, secondly, to solve marketing problems. This distinction serves as a basis for classifying marketing research into problem identification research and problem solving research.

Problem identification research is undertaken to help identify problems which are, perhaps, not apparent on the surface and yet exist or are likely to arise in the future like company image, market characteristics, sales analysis, short-range forecasting, long range forecasting, and business trends research. Research of this type provides information about the marketing environment and helps diagnose a problem. For example, the findings of problem solving research are used in making decisions which will solve specific marketing problems.

The Stanford Research Institute, on the other hand, conducts an annual survey of consumers that is used to classify persons into homogeneous groups for segmentation purposes. The National Purchase Diary panel (NPD) maintains the largest diary panel in the United States.

Standardized services are research studies conducted for different client firms but in a standard way. For example, procedures for measuring advertising effectiveness have been standardized so that the results can be compared across studies and evaluative norms can be established. The Starch Readership Survey is the most widely used service for evaluating print advertisements; another well-known service is the Gallup and Robinson Magazine Impact Studies. These services are also sold on a syndicated basis.

- Customized services offer a wide variety of marketing research services customized to suit a client's specific needs. Each marketing research project is treated uniquely.
- Limited-service suppliers specialize in one or a few phases of the marketing research project. Services offered by such suppliers are classified as field services, coding and data entry, data analysis, analytical services, and branded products. Field services collect data through the internet, traditional mail, in-person, or telephone interviewing, and firms that specialize in interviewing are called field service organizations. These organizations may range from small proprietary organizations which operate locally to large multinational organizations with WATS line interviewing facilities. Some organizations maintain extensive interviewing facilities across the country for interviewing shoppers in malls.
- Coding and data entry services include editing completed questionnaires, developing a coding scheme, and transcribing the data on to diskettes or magnetic tapes for input into the computer. NRC Data Systems provides such services.
- Analytical services include designing and pretesting questionnaires, determining the best means of collecting data, designing sampling plans, and other aspects of the research design. Some complex marketing research projects require knowledge of sophisticated procedures, including specialized experimental designs, and analytical techniques such as conjoint analysis and multidimensional scaling. This kind of expertise can be obtained from firms and consultants specializing in analytical services.
- Data analysis services are offered by firms, also known as tab houses, that specialize in computer analysis of quantitative data such as those obtained in large surveys. Initially most data analysis firms supplied only tabulations (frequency counts) and cross tabulations (frequency counts that describe two or more variables simultaneously). With the proliferation of software, many firms now have the capability to analyze their own data, but, data analysis firms are still in demand.
- Branded marketing research products and services are specialized data collection and analysis procedures developed to address specific types of marketing research problems. These procedures are patented, given brand names, and marketed like any other branded product.

== Marketing Techniques ==
Marketing research techniques come in many forms, including:

- Ad Tracking – periodic or continuous in-market research to monitor a brand's performance using measures such as brand awareness, brand preference, and product usage. (Young, 2005)
- Advertising research – used to predict copy testing or track the efficacy of advertisements for any medium, measured by the ad's ability to get attention (measured with AttentionTracking), communicate the message, build the brand's image, and motivate the consumer to purchase the product or service. (Young, 2005)
- Brand awareness research — the extent to which consumers can recall or recognize a brand name or product name
- Brand association research — what do consumers associate with the brand?
- Brand attribute research — what are the key traits that describe the brand promise?
- Brand name testing – what do consumers feel about the names of the products?
- Buyer decision-making process— to determine what motivates people to buy and what decision-making process they use; over the last decade, Neuromarketing emerged from the convergence of neuroscience and marketing, aiming to understand consumer decision-making process
- Commercial eye tracking research — examine advertisements, package designs, websites, etc. by analyzing visual behavior of the consumer
- Concept testing – to test the acceptance of a concept by target consumers
- Coolhunting (also known as trendspotting) – to make observations and predictions in changes of new or existing cultural trends in areas such as fashion, music, films, television, youth culture and lifestyle
- Copy testing – predicts in-market performance of an ad before it airs by analyzing audience levels of attention, brand linkage, motivation, entertainment, and communication, as well as breaking down the ad's flow of attention and flow of emotion. (Young, p 213)
- Customer satisfaction research – quantitative or qualitative studies that yields an understanding of a customer's satisfaction with a transaction
- Demand estimation — to determine the approximate level of demand for the product
- Distribution channel audits — to assess distributors’ and retailers’ attitudes toward a product, brand, or company
- Internet strategic intelligence — searching for customer opinions in the Internet: chats, forums, web pages, blogs... where people express freely about their experiences with products, becoming strong opinion formers.
- Marketing effectiveness and analytics — Building models and measuring results to determine the effectiveness of individual marketing activities.
- Mystery consumer or mystery shopping – An employee or representative of the market research firm anonymously contacts a salesperson and indicates he or she is shopping for a product. The shopper then records the entire experience. This method is often used for quality control or for researching competitors' products.
- Positioning research — how does the target market see the brand relative to competitors? – what does the brand stand for?
- Price elasticity testing — to determine how sensitive customers are to price changes
- Sales forecasting — to determine the expected level of sales given the level of demand. With respect to other factors like Advertising expenditure, sales promotion etc.
- Segmentation research – to determine the demographic, psychographic, cultural, and behavioral characteristics of potential buyers
- Online panel – a group of individuals who accepted to respond to marketing research online
- Store audit — to measure the sales of a product or product line at a statistically selected store sample to determine market share, or to determine whether a retail store provides adequate service
- Test marketing — a small-scale product launch used to determine the likely acceptance of the product when it is introduced into a wider market
- Viral Marketing Research – refers to marketing research designed to estimate the probability that specific communications will be transmitted throughout an individual's Social Network. Estimates of Social Networking Potential (SNP) are combined with estimates of selling effectiveness to estimate ROI on specific combinations of messages and media.

All these forms of marketing research can be classified as either problem-identification research or as problem-solving research.

There are two main sources of data — primary and secondary. Primary research is conducted from scratch. It is original and collected to solve the problem at hand. Secondary research already exists since it has been collected for other purposes. It is conducted on data published previously and usually by someone else. Secondary research costs far less than primary research but seldom comes in a form that meets the researcher's needs.

A similar distinction exists between exploratory research and conclusive research. Exploratory research provides insights into and comprehension of an issue or situation. It should draw definitive conclusions only with extreme caution. Conclusive research draws conclusions: the results of the study can be generalized to the whole population.

Exploratory research is conducted to explore a problem to get some basic idea about the solution at the preliminary stages of research. It may serve as the input to conclusive research. Exploratory research information is collected by focus group interviews, reviewing literature or books, discussing with experts, etc. This is unstructured and qualitative in nature. If a secondary source of data is unable to serve the purpose, a convenience sample of small size can be collected. Conclusive research is conducted to draw some conclusion about the problem. It is essentially, structured and quantitative research, and the output of this research is the input to management information systems (MIS).

Exploratory research is also conducted to simplify the findings of the conclusive or descriptive research, if the findings are very hard to interpret for the marketing managers.

== Methods ==
Methodologically, marketing research uses the following types of research designs:

Based on questioning
- Qualitative marketing research – generally used for exploratory purposes — small number of respondents — not generalizable to the whole population — statistical significance and confidence not calculated — examples include focus groups, in-depth interviews, and projective techniques
- Quantitative marketing research – generally used to draw conclusions — tests a specific hypothesis – uses random sampling techniques so as to infer from the sample to the population — involves a large number of respondents — examples include surveys and questionnaires. Techniques include choice modelling, maximum difference preference scaling, and covariance analysis.

Based on observations
- Ethnographic studies — by nature qualitative, the researcher observes social phenomena in their natural setting — observations can occur cross-sectionally (observations made at one time) or longitudinally (observations occur over several time-periods) – examples include product-use analysis and computer cookie traces. See also Ethnography and Observational techniques.
- Experimental techniques – by nature quantitative, the researcher creates a quasi-artificial environment to try to control spurious factors, then manipulates at least one of the variables — examples include purchasing laboratories and test markets. As described in the list of Marketing strategies.
- Secondary research – by nature qualitative, the researcher gathers information by accessing online and offline sources of information. These sources can be publicly available ones - examples include the Office of National Statistics in the UK, or data.gov in the US - or private sources of information - examples include textbooks and reports that are behind a paywall.

Researchers often use more than one research design. They may start with secondary research to get background information, then conduct a focus group (qualitative research design) to explore the issues. Finally they might do a full nationwide survey (quantitative research design) in order to devise specific recommendations for the client.

== Business to business ==
Business to business (B2B) research is inevitably more complicated than consumer research. Researchers need to know what type of multi-faceted approach will answer the objectives, since seldom is it possible to find the answers using only one method. Finding the right respondents is crucial in B2B research, since they are often busy, and may not want to participate. Respondents may also be biased on a particular topic. Encouraging them to “open up” is yet another skill required of the B2B researcher. Last but not least, most business research leads to strategic decisions and this means that the business researcher must have expertise in developing strategies that are strongly rooted in the research findings and acceptable to the client.

There are four key factors that make B2B market research special and different from consumer markets:

- The decision making unit is far more complex in B2B markets than in consumer markets.
- B2B products and their applications are more complex than consumer products.
- B2B marketers address a much smaller number of customers who are very much larger in their consumption of products than is the case in consumer markets.
- Personal relationships are of critical importance in B2B markets.

== International plan ==
International Marketing Research follows the same path as domestic research, but there are a few more problems that may arise. Customers in international markets may have very different customs, cultures, and expectations from the same company. They also require tailored translation approaches based on the expertise or resources available in the local country.

In this case, Marketing Research relies more on primary data rather than secondary information. Gathering the primary data can be hindered by language, literacy and access to technology. Basic Cultural and Market intelligence information will be needed to maximize the research effectiveness. Some of the steps that would help overcoming barriers include:

1. Collect secondary information on the country under study from reliable international source e.g. WHO and IMF
2. Collect secondary information on the product/service under study from available sources
3. Collect secondary information on product manufacturers and service providers under study in relevant country
4. Collect secondary information on culture and common business practices
5. Ask questions to get better understanding of reasons behind any recommendations for a specific methodology

== Common terms ==
Market research techniques resemble those used in political polling and social science research. Meta-analysis (also called the Schmidt-Hunter technique) refers to a statistical method of combining data from multiple studies or from several types of studies. Conceptualization means the process of converting vague mental images into definable concepts. Operationalization is the process of converting concepts into specific observable behaviors that a researcher can measure. Precision refers to the exactness of any given measure. Reliability refers to the likelihood that a given operationalized construct will yield the same results if re-measured. Validity refers to the extent to which a measure provides data that captures the meaning of the operationalized construct as defined in the study. It asks, “Are we measuring what we intended to measure?”

- Applied research sets out to prove a specific hypothesis of value to the clients paying for the research. For example, a cigarette company might commission research that attempts to show that cigarettes are good for one's health. Many researchers have ethical misgivings about doing applied research.
- Sugging (from SUG, for "selling under the guise" of market research) forms a sales technique in which sales people pretend to conduct marketing research, but with the real purpose of obtaining buyer motivation and buyer decision-making information to be used in a subsequent sales call.
- Frugging comprises the practice of soliciting funds under the pretense of being a research organization.

== Careers ==
Some of the positions available in marketing research include vice president of marketing research, research director, assistant director of research, project manager, field work director, statistician/data processing specialist, senior analyst, analyst, junior analyst and operational supervisor.

The most common entry-level position in marketing research for people with bachelor's degrees (e.g., BBA) is as operational supervisor. These people are responsible for supervising a well-defined set of operations, including field work, data editing, and coding, and may be involved in programming and data analysis. Another entry-level position for BBAs is assistant project manager. An assistant project manager will learn and assist in questionnaire design, review field instructions, and monitor timing and costs of studies. In the marketing research industry, however, there is a growing preference for people with master's degrees. Those with MBA or equivalent degrees are likely to be employed as project managers.

A small number of business schools also offer a more specialized Master of Marketing Research (MMR) degree. An MMR typically prepares students for a wide range of research methodologies and focuses on learning both in the classroom and the field.

The typical entry-level position in a business firm would be junior research analyst (for BBAs) or research analyst (for MBAs or MMRs). The junior analyst and the research analyst learn about the particular industry and receive training from a senior staff member, usually the marketing research manager. The junior analyst position includes a training program to prepare individuals for the responsibilities of a research analyst, including coordinating with the marketing department and sales force to develop goals for product exposure. The research analyst responsibilities include checking all data for accuracy, comparing and contrasting new research with established norms, and analyzing primary and secondary data for the purpose of market forecasting.

As these job titles indicate, people with a variety of backgrounds and skills are needed in marketing research. Technical specialists such as statisticians obviously need strong backgrounds in statistics and data analysis. Other positions, such as research director, call for managing the work of others and require more general skills. To prepare for a career in marketing research, students usually:

- Take all the marketing courses.
- Take courses in statistics and quantitative methods.
- Acquire computer skills.
- Take courses in psychology and consumer behavior.
- Acquire effective written and verbal communication skills.
- Think creatively.

== Corporate hierarchy ==
1. Vice-president of Marketing Research: This is the senior position in marketing research. The VP is responsible for the entire marketing research operation of the company and serves on the top management team. Sets the objectives and goals of the marketing research department.
2. Research Director: Also a senior position, the director has the overall responsibility for the development and execution of all the marketing research projects.
3. Assistant Director of Research: Serves as an administrative assistant to the director and supervises some of the other marketing research staff members.
4. (Senior) Project Manager: Has overall responsibility for design, implementation, and management of research projects.
5. Statistician/Data Processing Specialist: Serves as an expert on theory and application of statistical techniques. Responsibilities include experimental design, data processing, and analysis.
6. Senior Analyst: Participates in the development of projects and directs the operational execution of the assigned projects. Works closely with the analyst, junior analyst, and other personnel in developing the research design and data collection. Prepares the final report. The primary responsibility for meeting time and cost constraints rests with the senior analyst.
7. Analyst: Handles the details involved in executing the project. Designs and pretests the questionnaires and conducts a preliminary analysis of the data.
8. Junior Analyst: Handles routine assignments such as secondary data analysis, editing and coding of questionnaires, and simple statistical analysis.
9. Field Work Director: Responsible for the selection, training, supervision, and evaluation of interviewers and other field workers.

== See also ==
- Ad Tracking
- A/B testing
- Advertising research
- Commercial eye tracking
- Copy testing
- Consumer behavior
- Experimental techniques
- Enterprise Feedback Management (EFM)
- Global Marketing
- Integrated Marketing Communications
- Journal of Marketing Research
- Knowledge management
- List of marketing research firms
- Marketing
- Marketing Research Association
- Marketing Research Institute International (MRII)
- Marketing research mix
- Marketing research process
- Master of Marketing Research
- Observational techniques
- Propaganda
- Quantitative marketing research
- Qualitative marketing research
- Survey methodology
