= Mystery shopping =

Market research tool

Mystery shopping is a market research method in which a researcher poses as a customer, prospect or user to observe and report on the quality of a sales, service, compliance or customer-experience process, or on job performance. It may be used to assess a company’s own operations, competitors’ operations, or market practices more broadly. The Market Research Society adds that mystery shopping "differs from other research techniques in that the evaluator does not declare his/her presence and the participant is unaware at the time of the interaction that it is in any way different from a normal customer contact."

A mystery shopper, or secret shopper, mirrors common buyer behaviors to test the quality of the habits deemed important to a specific brand or industry. Mystery shoppers, who often operate as independent contractors or gig workers, submit detailed reports and feedback about their experiences.

== Industries and common usage ==
Mystery shopping assessments range from simple questionnaires to audio and video recordings. This type of market research can be used in any industry, from B2C and B2B, although B2B is less common.

Mystery shopping can be carried out in a direct-to-consumer or, less commonly, business-to-business environment. It can take the form of physical visits to business premises, or calling companies to evaluate their customer experience (also called mystery calling or customer experience research calling), or contacting companies through other methods such as email or web chat. Reports can range from completed questionnaires to video recordings.

Mystery shoppers interact with and report on a wide range of businesses and services, including gas stations, automotive dealerships, transportation, real estate, movie theaters, fitness clubs, insurance products, roadside assistance, healthcare, assisted living facilities, funeral homes and others. Industries that commonly use this research method include retail, hospitality and travel, restaurants and fast-food chains, financial services, and e-commerce.

== Market size ==
The mystery shopping industry generates $2B-$3B of revenue worldwide.

== Ethics ==
Some companies use mystery shopping to review employee performance, leading to concerns over employees being dismissed for performing poorly during a mystery shopping assessment. Organizations such as ESOMAR, the Market Research Society and the Mystery Shopping Professionals Association advise that, in such cases, research should only be used for employee incentive programs and that punishment or dismissal is an inappropriate use of mystery shopper data. However, there have been reports of employees being dismissed as a result of negative mystery shopper feedback.

The Mystery Shopping Professionals Association has created Common Codes of Professional Standards and Ethical Conduct. Other organizations that have created standards for mystery shopping are ESOMAR and the Market Research Society.

In the U.S. state of Nevada, mystery shoppers must be licensed by the Nevada Private Investigators Licensing Board and work under a company that has a private investigators license in order to perform mystery shopping jobs. Unlicensed mystery shoppers may face fines.

In June 2008, the American Medical Association's Council on Ethical and Judicial Affairs released a recommendation on the use of "secret shopper patients", stating that "physicians have an ethical responsibility to engage in activities that contribute to continual improvements in patient care. One method for promoting such quality improvement is through the use of secret shopper 'patients' who have been appropriately trained to provide feedback about physician performance in the clinical setting." However, in 2009, the council withdraw its report "in light of further testimony heard at the 2008 Interim Meeting [of the AMA House of Delegates]".

== Research ==
In published medical research, mystery shopping is known as a simulated patient research methodology. The checklist for reporting research using simulated patient methodology (CRiSP) should be used when reporting these research.

== Innovation in Mystery Shopping - "Digital Mystery Shopping (DMS)" ==
Traditional mystery shopping remains fundamentally unchanged since it first gained traction in the 1940s. More recently, the term "Digital Mystery Shopping (DMS)" takes the method into contemporary media. Digital Mystery Shopping is mystery shopping conducted through digital customer-contact channels, in which an evaluator acts as a genuine customer or prospect and objectively records how the organisation’s sales, service, compliance or customer-experience processes perform. Whereas traditional mystery shopping probes physical shops, Digital Mystery Shopping probes email estates, webforms, instant messaging, in-mail, chatbots and AI chat.

== UK examples ==
The UK government's Crown Commercial Service operated a mystery shopper scheme from February 2011 to November 2018, enabling suppliers to raise concerns about public procurement practice in England. The service was re-branded as the Public Procurement Review Service in November 2018 responding to feedback from suppliers and public bodies that the "mystery shopper" title did not properly reflect the role of the service. Section 40 of the Small Business, Enterprise and Employment Act 2015 created a statutory basis for some aspects of the review service. The Public Procurement Review Service was shut down in 2026.

Trading Standards conducts underage sales testing (mystery shopping tests) on businesses, using child volunteers, to find out which traders are selling age-restricted goods to children. The tests, which follow national guidelines, are undertaken to ensure traders are complying with the law. If a trader sells to the child volunteer, an investigation will take place which may involve legal action being taken.

Also in the UK, mystery shopping is increasingly used by local authorities, and other non-profit organizations such as housing associations and churches, to provide feedback on user satisfaction.

== See also ==
- List of confidence tricks § Mystery shopping
- Marketing research
- Observational techniques
- Participant observation
