= Sugging =

Promotion under the guise of research

Sugging is a term used in market research, which denotes promoting and selling under the guise of research. This happens when organisations build databases and solicit sales claiming to be conducting market research. In a genuine market research, individual respondents have guaranteed anonymity and is not used for sales or other purposes. It is generally considered an unethical practice, and is strictly prohibited by trade groups such as American Association for Public Opinion Research, Insights Association, Marketing Research Association, and Market Research Society.

== Definition ==
In marketing, Sugging denotes selling under the guise of market research. Organizations who engage in sugging build databases using data from market research and might use them for sales and other promotional activities. In a genuine market research, individual respondents have guaranteed anonymity and the data is not used for sales or other purposes.

== Components ==
In sugging, organizations engage in a deceptive practice and product marketeers misrepresent a statistical survey activity as genuine market research. It often misleads participants as they respond to the survey thinking that it is a genuine market research. The data collected from the research is used to promote products or services for sales. Organizations engaging in such practice often tailor the strategy to target individuals who have a higher probability or propensity towards buying. The survey questionnaire is also designed in a way to push the participants towards a particular viewpoint that would be conducive to sales.

== Impact ==
The major impact of sugging is that it can lead to a significant loss of trust among the respondents towards market research and the concerned organizations. If the participants learn about the actual nature of the survey, they often feel that they have been deceived and frustrated. As an unethical practice, Sugging often causes damage to genuine market research organizations as the participants have been manipulated previously, and are less likely to engage in such surveys in the future.

== Mitigation ==
Genuine market research organizations clearly state the purpose of the survey, and mitigate any doubts about the usage of customer data upfront when interacting with the public. They also create awareness to help customers differentiate genuine surveys and respond accordingly. Many market research agencies have individual codes and ethical guidelines to prevent sugging.

Generally considered unethical, this tactic is prohibited or strongly disapproved of by trade groups, such as the American Association for Public Opinion Research, Insights Association, Marketing Research Association, and Market Research Society for their member research companies.

== See also ==
- Frugging
- Push poll
