= Marketing Research Institute International =

University-sponsored training institute

The Marketing Research Institute International (MRII) is a non-profit institute affiliated with the University of Georgia and devoted to fulfilling the continuing educational needs of people worldwide in the marketing research profession. It begins this via Principles of Market Research for the core body of knowledge, from which it forms the basis of marketing research.

== History ==
In 1994, the Marketing Research Association (MRA) Board of Directors appointed a task force to determine the feasibility of creating a separate non-profit organization to create educational and training materials for the marketing and opinion research industry. This was fueled by a desire to create an independent study program based on the Marketing Research Core Body of Knowledge (MRCBOK™) developed by William Neal of SDR Consulting, Inc. and Dr. Malcolm McNiven of the University of Georgia. Approval was given and funds allocated in 1995 to establish the Marketing Research Association Institute (MRAI). A Board of Directors of industry representatives was formed to oversee the development of the Principles of Marketing Research (PoMR) in conjunction with the University of Georgia. The Marketing Research Association Institute was incorporated in June 1996 and was granted non-profit status as an educational institute by the IRS. In 1998, the Marketing Research Association Institute, Marketing Research Association and the University of Georgia entered into an alliance with the European Society of Opinion and Marketing Research (ESOMAR) for the purpose of marketing the Principles of Market Research course worldwide. In July, 1999, the organization formally changed its name to the Market Research Institute International (MRII). This was done to eliminate confusion about the Institute’s affiliation with any other industry organization, build broad-based industry support and demonstrate the global nature of its programs.

== Training and certifications ==
In 2013, The Professional Research Certification Program, PRC, granted that graduates of PoMR and PoPMR can receive an automatic examination exemption to the PRC program. With a copy of the University of Georgia Certificate of Program Completion and at least three years of market research experience, candidates can be accepted immediately in the program upon submission of written application. Graduates of the Principles programs can also earn the coveted CMRP (Certified Marketing Research Professional) designation by writing the CMRE (Certified Marketing Research Exam) to be administered by the MRIA (Marketing Research and Intelligence Association). To qualify to write the exam, you need to have a university degree from a recognized university, have at least two (2) years of relevant work experience in the marketing research industry, and have completed the MRIA Core course "102-Ethical Issues & Privacy in Marketing Research" (currently available online).

In 2014, MRII launched a new online, short course, Principles of Mobile Market Research. The online course presents insights into the different mobile research approaches and technologies. Researchers learn about trends in mobile phone usage worldwide, and how they can apply this new form of research to their work; be it quantitative, qualitative and global research.

=== Industry alliances ===
As noted above, MRA was the guiding force behind the development of the program and provided the initial funding. The American Marketing Association has officially supported the Principles of Marketing Research program since 1997. MRII, UGA and ESOMAR formed an educational alliance in 1998 to market the program globally. An official partnership agreement was adopted by these three organizations in March 1999. In November 1999, ARF officially endorsed the program. In 2002, the Professional Marketing Research Society in Canada (PMRS), now known as the Marketing Research and Intelligence Association (MRIA) and the Travel and Tourism Research Association (TTRA) also officially supported the course. In 2003, the Council of American Survey Research Organizations (CASRO) endorsed the program and in 2006 the Pharmaceutical Business Intelligence Research Group (PBIRG) signed on. In 2011, WIN/Gallup International endorsed the program. In 2013, the Greenbook's IIeX became a supporting organization.

The list of MRII’s current industry alliances are:

- American Marketing Association (AMA)
- Advertising Research Foundation (ARF)
- Council of American Survey Research Organization (CASRO)
- ESOMAR-World Research
- Marketing Research Association (MRA)
- Marketing Research and Intelligence Association (MRIA)
- Pharmaceutical Business Intelligence Research Group (PBIRG)
- University of Georgia - Master of Marketing Research Program (UGA)
- Pharmaceutical Marketing Research Group (PMRG) (Insights Association)
- GreenBook, New York AMA |IIeX (Greenbook Blog)

== Administration ==
From its founding in 1996 until the end of 2001, the MRA’s Executive Director also served as the part-time Executive Director of the MRII educational institute. In 2002, MRII established a separate office and hired a part-time Executive Director to oversee its operations. This was done in recognition of the growth of the Principles of Marketing Research course and the desire to make MRII an independent research institute.

MRII is governed by a Board of Directors made up of representatives from all sectors of the marketing research industry and by permanent representatives of MRA and UGA. The organization has established formal ends and operating policies, and has a Strategic Plan which is updated annually.

A Principles of Market Research Advisory Board was founded in 2002 and existed through 2005. The Advisory Board was an international network of research leaders who believed in the course’s mission, were committed to its positive role in the industry and its growth, and could guide the delivery of basic marketing research education to the largest possible number of research practitioners worldwide

=== Past Board Chairs ===
Period	President
1996-1997	Linda Tessar, Walker Research, Retired
1997-1998	Howard Gershowitz, Mktg., Inc. (USA)
1998-1999	Ron Kornokovich, OPINIONation, Retired
1999-2000	Bill Neal, SDR, Inc., Retired
2000-2001	Don Marek, AT&T, Retired
2001-2002	Joe Ottavani, Bellomy Research
2002-2004	Al Paison, The Customer Loyalty Research Center, Retired
2004-2005	Terry Grapentine, Grapentine Co., LLC
2006	Susan Adelman, Survey Service, Inc.
2007	John Kelly, Ceallaigh Associates, Retired
2008	Julie Williams, MaritzCX, Retired
2009	David Ashley, Department of Homeland Security
2010	Patrick "Pat" Crane, Eastman Kodak Company, Retired
2011	Charles “Chuck” Dodson, WILD Flavors, Inc., Retired
2012	John Lewington, Ph.D., Maryville University, Retired
2013	Charlotte E. Sibley, Sibley Associates
2014	Barry Watson, Environics
2015	Wayne McCullough, University of Michigan
2016	Lisa Courtade, Merck & Co.
2017	Jon Last, Sports & Leisure Research Group
2018	Jeffrey Henning, Researchscape International
2019	Dan Coates, Ypulse, Inc.
2020	Michael Mermelstein, Nichols Research
2021	Stephanie C. Harris, Visa
2022 (current)	Marjette Stark, Stark Solutions
