= Observational techniques =

In marketing and the social sciences, observational research (or field research) is a social research technique that involves the direct observation of phenomena in their natural setting. This differentiates it from experimental research in which a quasi-artificial environment is created to control for spurious factors, and where at least one of the variables is manipulated as part of the experilovement.

== In context ==
Observational research is a method of data collection that has become associated with qualitative research. Compared with quantitative research and experimental research, observational research tends to be less reliable but often more valid. The main advantage of observational research is flexibility. The researchers can change their approach as needed. Observational research measures behavior directly, rather than the subject's self-reports of behavior or intentions. The main disadvantage is it is limited to behavioral variables. It cannot be used to study cognitive or affective variables.

== Data collection methods ==
Generally, there are three methods used to collect data in observational research:

- Covert observational research – The researchers do not identify themselves. Either they mix in with the subjects undetected, or they observe from a distance. The advantages of this approach are: (1) It is not necessary to get the subjects' cooperation, and (2) The subjects' behaviour will not be contaminated by the presence of the researcher. Some researchers have ethical misgivings with the deceit involved in this approach.
- Overt observational research – The researchers identify themselves as researchers and explain the purpose of their observations. The problem with this approach is subjects may modify their behaviour when they know they are being watched. They portray their "ideal self" rather than their true self in what is called the Hawthorne Effect. The advantage that the overt approach has over the covert approach is that there is no deception (see, for example, PCIA-II
- Participant Observation – The researcher participates in what they are observing so as to get a finer appreciation of the phenomena.

== In marketing research ==
In marketing research, the most frequently used types of observational techniques are:

- Personal observation
  - observing products in use to detect usage patterns and problems
  - observing license plates in store parking lots
  - determining the socio-economic status of shoppers
  - determining the level of package scrutiny
  - determining the time it takes to make a purchase decision
- Mechanical observation
  - eye-tracking analysis while subjects watch advertisements
    - oculometers – what the subject is looking at
    - pupilometers – how interested is the viewer
  - electronic checkout scanners – records purchase behaviour
  - on-site cameras in stores
  - people meters (as in monitoring television viewing) e.g.Nielsen box
  - voice pitch meters – measures emotional reactions
  - psychogalvanometer – measures galvanic skin response
- Audits
  - retail audits to determine the quality of service in stores
  - inventory audits to determine product acceptance
  - shelf space audits
  - scanner based audits
- Trace Analysis
  - credit card records
  - computer cookie records
  - garbology – looking for traces of purchase patterns in garbage
  - detecting store traffic patterns by observing the wear in the floor (long term) or the dirt on the floor (short term)
  - exposure to advertisements
- Content analysis
  - observe the content of magazines, television broadcasts, radio broadcasts, or newspapers, either articles, programs, or advertisements

== See also ==
- Behavioral economics
- Consumer behaviour
- Content analysis
- Cultural anthropology
- Enterprise engagement
- Ethnography
- Experimental techniques
- Marketing
- Marketing research
- Qualitative marketing research
- Quantitative marketing research
- Usability testing
