= Viral marketing research =

Viral marketing research is a subset of marketing research that measures and compares the relative return on investment (ROI) of advertising and communication strategies designed to exploit social networks.

Algorithms are used to derive respondent-level coefficients of Social Networking Potential (SNP). These coefficients are integrated with respondent-level data measuring

1. the selling effectiveness of specific communications and
2. the Viral Marketing Potential of those communications within specific media (e.g., Internet video, texting, print ads, television).

Results identify strategies that are likely to drive sales among the target audience and be distributed throughout relevant social networks. Viral marketing is more of online and when it is done offline it is called buzz marketing.

== Examples ==
An electronics manufacture is about to launch a new video console and wants to maximize new product potential. In advance of the launch, Viral Marketing Research is used to compare the relative ROI of several strategies of among high SNP respondents within the target audience. Results help the manufacturer maximize sales by identifying what needs to be communicated and through which media (e.g., print ads, Internet videos, texting, television, auto).

A pharmaceutical company has developed a new drug for an existing drug category and needs to build brand recognition. Viral Marketing Research could be conducted among physicians or patients to identify which communication strategies are most likely to be spread by word-of-mouth, and which are likely to induce physicians/patients to prescribe/request the new drug.

== See also ==
- Market Research
- Social Networks
- Social Networking Potential
- Viral Marketing
