= Qualitative Market Research =

- Discipline: Marketing
- Language: English
- Edited by: Fiona Spotswood

Publication details
- History: 1998–present
- Publisher: Emerald Publishing
- Open access: Hybrid
- Impact factor: 1.6 (2023)

Standard abbreviations
- ISO 4: Qual. Mark. Res.

Indexing
- ISSN: 1352-2752 (print); 1352-2752 (web)

Links
- Journal homepage; Online archive

Qualitative Market Research: An International Journal is a peer-reviewed academic journal that publishes academic research on qualitative research methods and its applications in market research, marketing, and consumption. It is published by Emerald and the editor-in-chief is Fiona Spotswood (University of Bristol). The journal was established in 1998.

== Abstracting and indexing ==
The journal is abstracted and indexed in Scopus and the Social Sciences Citation Index. According to the Journal Citation Reports, its 2023 impact factor is 1.6.
