= Gerald Goodhardt =

British marketing scientist (1930–2020)

- Born: 5 April 1930
- Died: 7 May 2020 (aged 90)
- Occupation(s): Academic, Visiting Research Professor at University of South Australia, London South Bank University and Kingston University
- Title: Professor
- Spouse: Valerie Goodhardt
- Children: Catherine, Ian

Notes
- Fellow of the Royal Statistical Society: Chairman, General Applications Section (1976-78); Council Member (1978-81); Hon. Secretary (1982-88). Fellow of the Market Research Society: Gold Medal (1967); Chairman (1973-74); Vice-President (1974-77); New Gold Medal (“for an exceptional contribution to market research over very many years”) (1996).

Gerald Goodhardt (5 April 1930 - 7 May 2020) was a British marketing scientist.

== Career ==
Goodhardt began his career working as a statistician for Attwood Panels, and later Aske Research with Andrew S. C. Ehrenberg. From 1981-95 he was Sir John E Cohen Professor of Consumer Studies at The City University Business School.

Apart from being the Chairman of the Board at the Ehrenberg-Bass Institute for Marketing Science, Gerald Goodhardt was Emeritus Professor, City University; Visiting Professor, Kingston University and also a Visiting Research Associate, South Bank University. Formerly Sir John E Cohen Professor of Consumer Studies, and Dean of the City University Business School, Gerald has spent 20 years in industry and commerce prior to 20 years as an academic. He has served as Chairman of the Market Research Society (Gold Medalist in 1969 and 1996) and as Honorary Secretary of the Royal Statistical Society. Gerald was also founding President of the Market Research Benevolent Association, published extensively in marketing and statistical journals, mainly in quantitative aspects of consumer behaviour and the audience's use of broadcast media.

== Research ==
In the early 1980s, with Andrew Ehrenberg and Chris Chatfield, he extended the NBD model to account for brand choices. Finally published in 1984 the NBD-Dirichlet model of brand choice successfully modeled the repeated category and brand purchases within a wide variety of markets. 'The Dirichlet', as it became known, accounts for a number of empirical generalisations, including double jeopardy, the duplication of purchase law, and natural monopoly. It has been shown to hold over different product categories, countries, time, and for both subscription and repertoire repeat-purchase markets. It has been described as one of the most famous empirical generalisations in marketing. Independently, Schmittlein, Bemmaor and Morrison published the same model in Marketing Science and showed a variety of its statistical properties, in particular when it reduces to the simple NBD model. They labelled the univariate model as Beta Binomial/Negative Binomial Distribution. The model has since been extensively applied both by academics and marketing research consultancy firms.
