= Frugging =

Fundraising under the guise of research

Frugging is a term used in market research, which denotes fund-raising under the guise of research. This happens when organisations build databases or solicit funding claiming to be conducting market research. In a genuine market research, individual respondents have guaranteed anonymity and is not used for sales or other purposes. It is generally considered an unethical practice, and is strictly prohibited by trade groups such as American Association for Public Opinion Research and Market Research Society.

== Definition ==
In marketing, Frugging denotes raising funds under the guise of market research. Organizations who engage in frugging build databases using data from market research and might use them for fundraising, sales or other activities. In a genuine market research, individual respondents have guaranteed anonymity and the data is not used for sales or other purposes.

== Components ==
In frugging, organizations engage in a deceptive practice and product marketeers misrepresent a statistical survey activity as genuine market research. It often misleads participants as they respond to the survey thinking that it is a genuine market research. The data collected from the research is used to solicit and ask for donations. Organizations engaging in such practice often tailor the strategy to target individuals who have a higher probability of contributing financially. The survey questionnaire is also designed in a way to evoke an emotional feeling or a moral obligation to push the participants to contribute financially.

== Impact ==
The major impact of frugging is that it can lead to a significant loss of trust among the respondents towards market research and the concerned organizations. If the participants learn about the actual nature of the survey, they often feel that they have been deceived and frustrated. As an unethical practice, Frugging often causes damage to genuine market research organizations and charitable institutions as the participants have been manipulated previously, and are less likely to engage in such surveys in the future.

== Mitigation ==
Genuine market research organizations often clearly state the purpose of the survey, and mitigate any doubts about the usage of customer data upfront when interacting with the public. This ensures transparency, and might elicit an honest response from the customer. Many market research agencies and charitable organizations have individual codes and ethical guidelines to prevent frugging.

Regulatory bodies also enact laws and enforce regulations to protect consumers from such unethical activities. This tactic is strictly prohibited by trade groups, such as the American Association for Public Opinion Research (AAPOR) and the Market Research Society (MRS), for their member research companies. AAPOR ensures that marketeers are not allowed to reach out to someone under the guise of survey, and solicit for funding, or promote a product in the United States. MRS enforces the United Kingdom laws on data collection such as the Data Protection Act of 1998, and operates a helpline for consumers to complain if they encounter such practices. Similar laws exist in the European Union that prohibit frugging.

== See also ==
- Push poll
- Sugging
