= YouScan =

Ukrainian social media monitoring platform

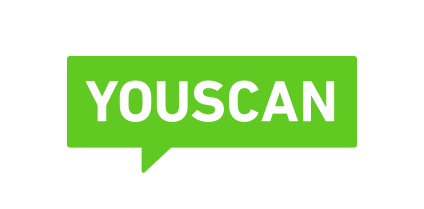
- Type: Private
- Industry: Social media and online media monitoring and analytics
- Founded: 2009
- Founder: Alex (Oleksii) Orap
- Headquarters: Kyiv, Ukraine
- Key people: Leonid Lytvynenko (CEO)
- Products: Social Listening Platform with Visual Analysis
- Website: https://youscan.io/

YouScan is a global social media and online media monitoring, analytics and social media listening platform powered by artificial intelligence. It features text, image, and audience analysis capabilities, helping businesses analyze user opinions, extract valuable consumer insights, and manage their online reputation.

== History ==
YouScan was founded in 2009 by Alex Orap. In 2010, YouScan joined Microsoft's BizSpark startup support program, and in 2019, it became a participant in Nvidia's AI startup support program, Nvidia Inception.

Between 2013 and 2018, YouScan developed a tool for finding potential customers (leads) in social networks, LeadScanner. In 2015, YouScan secured a Series A funding round led by two investment funds Kinnevik AB and VNV Global AB (Sweden), which, along with Hype Ventures, became the company's shareholders. Also, YouScan introduced a new image recognition technology called "Visual Insights," which helps companies track images containing their brand logo and analyze the context of those images.

In 2019, Gartner included YouScan in their “Cool AI Vendors for Marketing” report.

In July 2022, YouScan raised $2 million in investments from existing investors. In August 2023, YouScan became one of the first companies to participate in the Braveproject, which aims to raise $1M for military and humanitarian donations for Ukraine. Also, YouScan helps DonorUA track the demand for blood donations across Ukraine, quickly responding to requests from blood centers, patients, and their families. Additionally, the use of YouScan's analytical services contributes to the continuous improvement of the DonorUA platform.

In 2023, the company launched Insights Copilot, the first AI-powered social media analytics assistant based on ChatGPT. From June 2023, YouScan offers 4 days work week to its employees in summer. In 2024, Newsweek and the Best Practice Institute included YouScan in the "Top 100 Most Loved Workplaces of 2024" list.

In 2024, Alex Orap was recognized as one of the Top-5 Tech Pioneers in Social Intelligence in The Social Intelligence Lab Insider50 rating.

In 2025, YouScan launched a Free AI Detector tool, which helps identify AI-generated content and improve texts, so they sound more authentic.

In May, the company was included in the top five most popular systems for Social Media Listening, according to the published ‘State of Social Listening 2025’ report. At the same time, YouScan was listed in the top 10 Global Most Loved Workplaces 2025 by Newsweek. Also, YouScan was recognized as one of Europe’s Most Loved Companies to Work For by the Maya Culture Awards.

On June 11, 2025, YouScan was selected as one of 35 Ukrainian startups to receive up to $100,000 in equity‑free funding, ongoing Google mentorship, product support, and Google Cloud credits as part of the final cohort of the Google for Startups Ukraine Support Fund.

In January 2026, the company YouScan launched the LinkedIn Post Analyzer, a free AI-powered tool that evaluates social media posts to enhance their effectiveness and reach.

In April, YouScan launched Tiger Finder, an AI-powered platform designed to identify TikTok influencers using natural language processing and visual content analysis.

YouScan is a member of the SBA, Swedish Business Association in Ukraine, Techosystem, Ukraine IT Association, and Lviv IT Cluster.

Notable clients include brands Vodafone, Coca-Cola, McDonald’s, Uklon, Samsung and others.
