= Chakrapani =

Chakrapani may refer to:

- Chakrapani, a name of the Hindu deity Vishnu, the chakra hand[ed] (pani)

== People with the surname ==
- Aluri Chakrapani (1908–1975), Indian film multilingual writer, producer and director
- Chuck Chakrapani, Indian research methodologist, educator, and author
- M. G. Chakrapani (1911–1986), Indian actor in the Tamil film industry
- Ghanta Chakrapani (born 1965), Indian sociologist, journalist and political analyst in Telugu media

== People with the given name ==
- Chakrapani (politician), Indian political activist and ascetic
- Chakrapani Chalise (1883–1958), Nepalese poet
- Chakrapani Datta, 11th century Bengali physician and scholar
- Chakrapani Khanal, Nepalese politician
- Chakrapani Shukla (born 1916), Indian politician

== Other uses ==
- Chakrapani Temple, Kumbakonam, Tamil Nadu, India
- Chakrapani (film), a 1954 Telugu-language film
