= Realitymine =

RealityMine
- Company type: Privately held
- Industry: Market Research
- Founded: Manchester, England 2012
- Founder: Garry Partington, Rolfe Swinton
- Headquarters: Manchester, England, United Kingdom
- Key people: Chris Havemann, CEO; Shelagh Rogan, CFO; Chris Shaw, COO; Graham Dean, CTO; Luke Biggins, Senior Director Business Development; Jonathan Briggs, Managing Director APAC; Edward Chatham, Senior Director Business Development; Ewan Leith, Head of Engineering; Phil Austin, Head of Data Services; Will Byers, Financial Controller
- Number of employees: 50+

RealityMine is a technology company headquartered in Manchester, England, United Kingdom which provides passive research into consumer behavior. The company was founded in April 2012 by mobile veteran Garry Partington and market research expert Rolfe Swinton, to understand the huge gap in understanding consumer behaviour: what are people actually doing on their mobile phones?

RealityMine provides cross-device measurement technology used by market research and media organisations to monitor consumer behaviour. Its product, the "RealityMeter," supports Android, iOS and desktop platforms. RealityMine has offices in New York, London, Manchester, and Sydney.

== History ==
The company was founded in April 2012 by Garry Partington and Rolfe Swinton. In December 2013, RealityMine acquired the assets of the Media Behaviour Insights, including the TouchPoints USA brand.

From 2012, the business has grown from 5 employees to 75 in 2015. In 2015 RealityMine joined the London Stock Exchange's Elite programme for high growth businesses. In January 2015 the business announced $2.5m investment to support its rapid growth strategy.

In 2018, former Research Now co-founder, Chris Havemann, was named CEO.

== Honors and awards ==
RealityMine has won awards including "2015 Top 100 Startups", "2015 Mobile Research Agency of the Year" by MRMW, "2015 Top 100 Europe" by Red Herring, "2015 Northern Tech Rising Star" by GP Bullhound, "2016 Queens Award for International Export", and was a "Best Innovation Finalist" in the 2016 MRS Awards by the Market Research Society.
