= Parent and child =

Parent and child or child and parent usually refers to a parent and child (infant, toddler, youth, adolescent) or family. It may also refer to any abstract concept in which one element (the child) is derived from or associated to another element (the parent):

- Oya-ko rocks, or "parent-and-child", a pair of rock formations offshore from Samani, Hokkaido, Japan
- Oyakodon, or "parent-and-child donburi", a Japanese rice bowl dish
- Process (computing), which may have a parent process and one or more child processes created using a fork
- Tree (data structure), which may consist of parent and child nodes

== Other ==
- Scholastic Parent & Child, a magazine
- Child and Parent Resource Institute, in London, Ontario, Canada
- Parent–child interaction therapy
- Parent-Child Interaction Assessment-II
