= PCIA =

PCIA may refer to:

- Parent-Child Interaction Assessment-II (PCIA-II)
- Phenol–chloroform extraction
- People's Commissariat for Internal Affairs
- PCIA - The Wireless Infrastructure Association
