= Innovation game =

Market research exercise

Within qualitative marketing research, an innovation game is a form of primary market research developed by Luke Hohmann where customers play a set of directed games as a means of generating feedback about a product or service. The research is primary because the data collected is gathered directly from customers or prospects and is intended to answer a specific research question. (Secondary research is data collected previously by others, usually through primary research, that may or may not address a specific research question.) “Customers” who play innovation games are commonly direct recipients or consumers of a specific product or service. In some cases, though, game players may be any person or system who is or would be affected by a product or service.

Innovation games are directed by a facilitator whose responsibilities include:

- explaining the game(s) to be played;
- controlling the pacing and tempo of each game;
- monitoring participation levels; and,
- managing time of the overall game-play event.

The successful operation of an innovation game relies on collaborative play among the participants and a set of observers drawn from disparate functional groups within an organization. For example, a typical game setting for a word processing software might include participants drawn from two or three corporate customers along with observers comprising the product's quality assurance manager, technical architect, product manager, developer, sales executive, or any one else on the product team. Arguably, the most important observer is the product manager because that person is responsible for acting on the data generated by the game. However, a single observer cannot possible capture all of the nonverbal and nuanced communication that players exhibit, so all observers play a significant and irreplaceable role in the effective utility of the game.

== A description ==
There are at least 12 unique innovation games (and any number of new games derived by combining elements of these 12 games).

- 20/20 Vision: Several potential product features appear on a shuffled set of note cards, one feature per card. The facilitator tapes the first card face-out onto the wall and displays each of the remaining cards one at a time to the participants, asking if the feature on the card is more or less important than the feature on the wall. No two features are allowed to be of equal importance.
- Buy a Feature: Participants see a list of proposed product features and a cost (expressed as development effort or street-level pricing) associated with each. Each participant "buys" a desirable feature; participants may also pool resources to buy features too expensive to be purchased with individual funds.
- Give Them a Hot Tub: Several potential product features appear on a shuffled set of note cards, one feature per card. Some of the proposed features are completely outrageous, such as a "crush rocks" setting for a new food blender. Observers note what happens when a customer uncovers one of these outrageous features.
- Me and My Shadow: Observers carefully record a participant using a product or service. Observers sit next to the participant to watch for and listen to actions, expressions, comments, and suggestions. Observers ask questions of the participant, such as "Why are you doing that," or "what are you thinking at this moment".
- Product Box: Participants imagine that they're selling a vendor's product at a tradeshow, retail outlet, or public market. Participants use plain cardboard boxes, glue, paint, crayons, and other scraps and knickknacks to design a product box that they would buy.
- Prune the Product Tree: A very large tree (representing a system or product) is drawn on a whiteboard. Thick limbs represent major areas of functionality within the system. The edge of the tree—its outermost branches—represent the features available in the current release of the product. Participants write new features on several index cards that are shaped like leaves, and then they place these feature-leaves onto the tree, revealing which branches (product features) are important to customers for future improvements.
- Remember the Future: Participants imagine a time in the future when they will have been using the product almost continuously between now and then. ("Future" may be expressed in months, years, or some other time frame.) Participants then write down exactly what the product will have done to make them happy, successful, rich, safe, secure, etc.
- Show and Tell: Participants bring in examples of artifacts created or modified by the product or service. Participants explain why these artifacts are important, and how and when they are used.
- Speed Boat: A drawing of a boat appears on a white board or sheet of butcher paper. Anchors "attached" to the boat prevent it from moving quickly through the water. The boat represents a product or system, and the anchors are features that the participants don't like. The lower the anchor, the more debilitating the feature.
- Spider Web: A product name appears at the center of a circle drawn in the middle of a whiteboard. Participants draw other products and services, explaining how, when, and why they are used. Participants then draw lines that link these additional services to each other and to the product's circle.
- Start Your Day: Participants describe their daily, weekly, monthly, and yearly events related to their use of a product. Descriptions are written on pre-printed, poster-sized calendars or timelines taped to the walls. Participants include events with time frames that match the product's expected lifecycle or release cycle. Participants may also include one-time events (particularly horrible days where everything goes wrong) and describe how the product helps or hinders as the event unfolds.
- The Apprentice: An engineer or product developer uses the product as an end-user. For example, if the system is used for data entry, the developer enters data for a couple of days. Observers record the engineer's actions, expressions, comments, and suggestions.

== Selecting an appropriate game ==
While any number or variety of innovation games may be invented, combined, or adapted from other game environments, all such games have strengths and weaknesses that constrain their applicability to specific kinds of problems. These strengths and weaknesses are expressed as six separate dimensions:

1. the degree of open-ended exploration: how much or how little the participants are constrained in their interactions
2. the degree of scalability: the number of customers who can play the game at any one time
3. the degree of physical preparation: what kinds of supplies or materials are necessary to play the game
4. the degree of market preparation: how much background effort is necessary to provide data or content for the game
5. the degree of customer preparation: what pre-game activities, if any, to require of the participants before entering the game environment
6. the time frame of action: how long after the game completes before the participant expects a product's improvement to reflect the game's results

== See also ==
- Consumer behavior
- Focus group
- Gamestorming
- Marketing research
