= EFAMRO =

EFAMRO is a federation of national bodies representing the market research profession in Europe.

== Members ==
EFAMRO is composed of 16 national bodies:

Association	Country
ADM	Germany
AIMRO	Republic of Ireland
ANEIMO	Spain
APODEMO	Portugal
ASSIRM	Italy
BAMOR	Bulgaria
FEBMAR	Belgium
LRSTA	Lithuania
MOA	Netherlands
MRS	UK
OFBOR	Poland
OIROM	Russia
SMIF	Sweden
SMTL	Finland
VMOA	Norway
VSMS-ASMS	Switzerland

== Activities ==
EFAMRO has three primary roles:

- To adjudicate on cross-border complaints made against market research organizations through a self-regulatory framework
- To provide a common voice for national bodies when lobbying at a European or international level
- To develop and enhance international quality standards for market research (most notably the ISO 20252 quality standard which EFAMRO initiated)

EFAMRO co-ordinates these activities with other research bodies globally through its participation in the Global Research Business Network (GRBN), a joint initiative with the Asia Pacific Research Committee (APRC) and the Americas Research Industry Alliance (ARIA).

== Leadership ==
EFAMRO is led by an Executive Board overseen by Jan Oostveen (Director General) and Andrew Cannon (President).
