= Chuck Chakrapani =

Indian academic

Chuck (TK) Chakrapani
- Born: Chennai, India
- Education: Stirling University, SV University, University of Madras
- Occupations: President of Leger Analytics; Distinguished Visiting Professor, Ted Rogers School of Management, Ryerson University, Canada; DataPrompt International, India
- Website: chuckchakrapani.com

Chuck Chakrapani is a research methodologist, educator, author, expert witness, and magazine and journal editor. He is currently president of Leger Analytics, and holds several concurrent positions in different countries: Distinguished Visiting professor at the Ted Rogers School of Management, Ryerson University in Canada, and of DataPrompt International in India. He is a member of the board of directors of Marketing Research Institute International, a founding board member of Canadian Research Insights Council (CRIC), and of Certified Analytics and Insights Professionals (CAIP). Chuck is a writer, editor, and speaker on the subject of Stoic philosophy.

== Education and career ==
Chakrapani was educated in India (University of Madras SV University and at the London Business School in England. After a few years at Canadian Facts, then the largest research house in Canada, he became partner and managing director of Applied Marketing Statistics and was president of the research consultancy firm Standard Research Systems. In 2003 he was named the CEO of Millward Brown Canada. Between the years 2006 and 2010 he was the Research Mentor at the Ted Rogers School of Business and senior research fellow at the Centre for the Study of Commercial Activity. In 2010 he was appointed the president of Leger's Toronto offices and currently serves as the president of its analytic division. Between 1986 and 2010, he also served as the Founding Chairman of the Investors Association of Canada. Chakrapani provides expert witness testimony, especially in cases involving intellectual property issues.

Chakrapani is a fellow of the Royal Statistical Society and was elected a Fellow of the Marketing Research and Intelligence Association for his "outstanding contributions to Marketing Research in Canada".

== Editorships ==
Chakrapani was the editor of the Canadian Journal of Marketing Research published by the Marketing and Intelligence Association for over 20 years until 2004. He edited Money Digest magazine published by the Investors Association of Canada between 1986 and 2002. He was the editor of Marketing Research, published by the American Marketing Association. Under his stewardship, Marketing Research earned the distinction of being the "world's best magazine," an honour conferred by the UK-based Emerald Group, the largest publisher of technical journals in the world.

In 2012 he resigned his editorship in protest against perceived AMA censorship. The association refused to publish an article critical of AMA's Advanced Research Techniques Forum and two related articles, even though they were approved for publication in the "Back Talk" section by the editor-in-chief. In protest Chakrapani resigned his editorship of the magazine with the comment "if Marketing Research is a pamphlet for the AMA, I am certainly the wrong editor."

Because of the subsequent outcry about censorship both online and offline, the CEO wrote an explanatory note. In spite of the CEO's explanation, the controversy over censorship continued. Finally, as part of the negotiated approach, AMA agreed to allow Chakrapani to write the details of what happened. The article reproduced extracts from 28 emails that revealed exactly what transpired at the AMA and outside that led to the censorship action. AMA also agreed to publish the articles which were initially turned down. Chakrapani was asked if he would like to resume his editorship of the magazine which he declined. The magazine has, since then, changed its name and its editorial mission.

== Publications ==
Chakrapani is the author of over a dozen books on marketing research and investing. He has authored over 100 articles on different topics. Some of his recent publications include:

=== Books ===
- Practical Marketing Research (2020) with Ken Deal and Jordan Levitin.) Published by Standard Research Systems.
- Analytics for Customer Insights (2018) Published by Standard Research Systems.
- Business Statistics, 2nd Ed (2014) Published by Wiley (with Black and Castillo).
- Modern Marketing Research Step-by-Step (2011) Online Edition. (Earlier edition published by Pearson Education in 2006.)
- Statistics in Marketing Research (2005) Published by Arnold (UK). Distributed in the US by Oxford University Press.
- Marketing Research: State of Art Perspectives (2000). American Marketing Association.

=== Papers ===
- Journal of Place Management and Development (2010 Highly Commended Paper Award)
- On the validity of online panels. Canadian Journal of Marketing Research, 24.1, 8–14. (Best research paper award Chris Commins Award for the best peer-reviewed paper published in CJMR in 2007)

Behavioral Economics: Three Tips to Better Questionnaires misspelled Tversky. It appears at "Tersky." https://uga.view.usg.edu/content/enforced4/1907600-GC90054MR/module%20intro%20to%20market%20research/extras/behavioral-economics-three-tips-to-better-questionnaires.pdf?_&d2lSessionVal=v78arJv5V3Ro9uGrtutRjPGL6&ou=1907600

== Stoicism ==
In addition to his activities in research and analytics, Chuck also has an interest in ancient Hellenistic philosophies, Stoicism in particular. He is the founder and editor of a monthly digital magazine, THE STOIC. The Stoic Gym He has published over 15 books on Stoic philosophy and has spoken at the Stoic international conference, Stoicon. Some of his books on Stoicism include:

- Unshakable Freedom (2016) Published by The Stoic Gym.
- The Good Life Handbook (2016) Published by The Stoic Gym.
- How to be a Stoic When You Don’t Know How (2020) Published by The Stoic Gym.

== Teaching ==
While being active in the professional community, Chakrapani also taught in higher learning institutions such as University of Liverpool, London Business School, University of Guelph for the Marketing and Intelligence Association and for the American Marketing Association. He has been an invited speaker in several countries around the world. He is active in the educational activities of the Marketing Research Institute International (MRII), which offers marketing research courses online in collaboration with the University of Georgia. He was the master editor for their online courses Principles of Marketing Research and serves on the Board of MRII. Commenting on his active role in educational activities Vue (the official magazine of the Marketing Research and Intelligence Association) noted that "Chuck may have single-handedly taught the entire market research community in this country".

== Associations and awards ==
Chakrapani was, for several years, a member of the Board of Governors which adjudicated what is generally considered to be the most prestigious marketing research award: Charles Coolidge Parlin Marketing Research Award. He also headed the panel which awarded the David K. Hardin Memorial Award. He is considered one of the pioneers in applying analytic techniques to marketing and has been described as "one of the most respected names in the marketing research industry".
