= Parent-Child Interaction Assessment-II Modifying Attributions of Parents =

The Parent-Child Interaction Assessment-II Modifying Attributions of Parents (PCIA-II/MAP) intervention is a brief cognitive-behavioral manualized treatment for parents in high-risk families (Bohr, 2008, 2005, 2004a, 2004b; Bohr & Holigrocki, 2005). A parent and child are video recorded during a structured play activity (see PCIA-II; Holigrocki, Kaminski, & Frieswyk, 1999, 2002) and sessions involve the therapist and parent discussing excerpts from the video and conclude with a post-treatment assessment.

After filming the interaction, the clinical research team meets to review the video to identify areas of parenting strength and problematic behavior in the parent or child. Next, the parent meets with the therapist for four intervention sessions. Treatment is directed at helping the parent to develop parenting strengths and to identify and modify inaccurate, dysfunctional, or negative attributions. The intervention involves showing the parent the video recorded parent-child interaction. In each of the intervention sessions, the therapist points out parenting strengths, creates a dialogue about what the child may be thinking, feeling, and intending; and then elicits and discusses with the parent other possible attributions for the child's behavior. After the intervention sessions, the post-treatment meeting involves filming the dyad again and having parent complete a series of measures to assess treatment efficacy.

The PCIA-II/MAP intervention is being used in treatment and outcome research in Ontario, Canada. A randomized controlled trial is in progress with women victims of partner violence in the USA.

== See also ==
- Child psychotherapy
