= Bounce rate =

Internet marketing term in web traffic analysis

Bounce rate is an Internet marketing term used in web traffic analysis. It represents the percentage of visitors who enter the site and then leave ("bounce") rather than continuing to view other pages within the same site. Bounce rate is calculated by counting the number of single page visits and dividing that by the total visits. It is then represented as a percentage of total visits.

Bounce rate is a measure of "stickiness." The thinking being that an effective website will engage visitors deeper into the website thus encouraging visitors to continue with their visit. It is expressed as a percentage and represents the proportion of single page visits to total visits.

Bounce rate (%) = Visits that access only a single page (#) ÷ Total visits (#) to the website.

== Purpose ==
Bounce rates can be used to help determine the effectiveness or performance of an entry page at generating the interest of visitors. An entry page with a low bounce rate means that the page effectively causes visitors to view more pages and continue deeper into the website.

High bounce rates typically indicate that the website is not doing a good job of attracting the continued interest of visitors. That means visitors only view single pages without looking at others or taking some form of action within the site before a specified time period. Search engine optimization factors such as page load time and content relevance influence user retention and contribute to lower bounce rates.

Interpretation of the bounce rate measure should be relevant to a website's business objectives and definitions of conversion, as having a high bounce rate is not always a sign of poor performance. On sites where an objective can be met without viewing more than one page, for example on websites sharing specific knowledge on some subject (dictionary entry, specific recipe), the bounce rate would not be as meaningful for determining conversion success. In contrast, the bounce rate of an e-commerce site could be interpreted in correlation with the purchase conversion rate, providing the bounces are considered representative of visits where no purchase was made. Typically, Bounce Rate for e-commerce websites is in the range of 20% to 45%, with top performers operating at a 36% average Bounce Rate.

== Construction ==
A bounce occurs when a website visitor only views a single page on a website, that is, the visitor leaves a site without visiting any other pages before a specified session-timeout occurs. There is no industry standard minimum or maximum time by which a visitor must leave in order for a bounce to occur. Rather, this is determined by the session timeout of the analytics tracking software.

$R_b = \frac{T_v}{T_e}$

where

- R_{b} = Bounce rate
- T_{v} = Total number of visitors viewing one page only
- T_{e} = Total entries to page

A visitor may bounce by:

- Clicking on a link to a page on a different website
- Closing an open window or tab
- Typing a new URL
- Clicking the "Back" button to leave the site
- Session timeout

There are two exceptions: 1) You have a one-page website 2) Your offline value proposition is so compelling that people would see just one single webpage and get all the information they need and leave.

A commonly used session timeout value is 30 minutes. In this case, if a visitor views a page, does not look at another page, and leaves his or her browser idle for longer than 30 minutes, they will register as a bounce. If the visitor continues to navigate after this delay, a new session will occur.

The bounce rate for a single page is the number of visitors who enter the site at a page and leave within the specified timeout period without viewing another page, divided by the total number of visitors who entered the site at that page. In contrast, the bounce rate for a website is the number of website visitors who visit only a single page of a website per session divided by the total number of website visits.

== Caveats ==
While site-wide bounce rate can be a useful metric for sites with well-defined conversion steps requiring multiple page views, it may be of questionable value for sites where visitors are likely to find what they are looking for on the entry page. This type of behavior is common on web portals and referential content sites. For example, a visitor looking for the definition of a particular word may enter an online dictionary site on that word's definition page. Similarly, a visitor who wants to read about a specific news story may enter a news site on an article written for that story. These example entry pages could have a bounce rate above 80% (thereby increasing the site-wide average), however they may still be considered successful.

== See also ==
- Exit rate
- Landing page
- Landing page optimization
- Web analytics
- Conversion rate
