= Gamestorming =

Gamestorming is a set of practices for facilitating innovation in the business world. A facilitator leads a group towards some goal by way of a game, a structured activity that provides scope for thinking freely, even playfully.

The word gamestorming, itself as a neologism, is a portmanteau suggestive of using games for brainstorming.

A game may be thought of as an alternative to the standard business meeting. Most games involve 3 to 20 people and last from 15 minutes to an hour and a half. A game suspends some of the usual protocols of life and replaces them with a new set of rules for interaction. Games may require a few props such as sticky notes, poster paper, markers, random pictures from magazines, or thought provoking objects. Gamestorming skills include asking questions (opening, navigating, examining, experimenting, closing), structuring large diagrams, sketching ideas, fusing words and pictures into visual language, and most importantly, improvising to choose and lead a suitable game or invent a new one.

The Gamestorming book is used in classes on interactive design and user experience, and social media marketing and referenced in innovation, product development, visual note taking and self-realization.

== Origins of games ==
The gamestorming culture originated in the 1970s in Silicon Valley. Some of the games have earlier roots, for example, Button is inspired by the Native American Talking Stick tradition, and Show and Tell is known from elementary school.

== See also ==
- Business game
- Creativity technique
- Facilitation (business)
- Finite and infinite games
- Game § Business games
- Innovation game
- Open innovation
- Serious game
- Seven Management and Planning Tools
- Team building
- Technological innovation system
- User experience design
