= Oculometer =

Device measuring eye movement

Oculometer is a device that tracks eye movement. The oculometer computes eye movement by tracking corneal reflection relative to the center of the pupil. An oculometer, which can provide continuous measurements in real time, can be a research tool to understand gaze as well as cognitive function. Further, it can be applied for hands-free control. It has applications in flight training, cognitive assessment, disease diagnosis, and treatment. The oculometer relies on the principle that when a collimated light beam is incident on the eye, the direction in which the eye moves is proportional to the position of the reflection of that light beam from the cornea with respect to the center of the pupil. Eye movements can be accurately measured over a linear range of more than 20$^\circ$ with a resolution of 0.1$^\circ$.

== History ==
Eye movement and tracking have been studied for centuries, with the very first eye tracking being simple observation of the eyes, by either oneself or another. The first improvement on this occurred in 1738, when an observer would feel the outside of closed eyelids to track eye movement. Next in 1879, an innovation to listen to muscle movements using a kymograph was implemented. Though rudimentary, these early techniques show repeated need throughout history to track eye movements.

The first true eye tracking device was invented by Huey in 1898. To work, this device was required to contact the cornea, which limited its comfort, usability, and generalizability.

It was not until the 20th century that a robust, non-contact, modern eye-tracker came to fruition. This device, called the photocornograph, worked by photographing eye movement based on reflection from the cornea. This device only recorded horizontal movements, until the work of Judd and colleagues in 1905 added both temporal and vertical recording.

Due to the many applications of an eye tracking device to aviators and pilots, NASA and the United States Air Force carried out extensive studies on this technology, propelling the field forward. Much of this took place during the 1970s and 1980s. However even with this extensive research, oculometers remained bulky and technically difficult.

Research-grade oculometers finally received a user-friendly redesign, with commercial devices available as of recently. These low-profile devices can be worn non-intrusively on a pair of eyeglasses.

== Advantages ==
Since the principles governing the workings of the oculometer rely on a relatively simple concept (electro-optical sensing of the eye), it ensures that the oculometer will be functional whenever the user is seeing. Additionally, the position of the reflection of the collimated beam from the cornea can be approximated to be on the plane of the pupil. This implies minimal parallax error between the corneal reflection and the center of the pupil, thus making the oculometer insensitive to changes in the head position during measurements. These properties of the oculometer ensures minimal interference with the routine activities of the user during measurements. It also negates the need for extensive equipment like bite plates or rigid skull clamping for measurements.

== Optical components ==
- Light source: Source of illumination such as cathode ray tube or glow modulator tube
- Filter: light is filtered such that light incident on the eye is near infrared
- Polarizer: light from the source is polarized to capture only true corneal reflections
- Eyepiece: the user looks through an objective lens in an eyepiece, through which the illumination beam travels to irradiate the eye
- Lenses: two collimating lenses
- Beam splitters: one beam splitter directs visible light to the eye, the other directs light to the detector
- Detector: a silicon diode camera records measurements

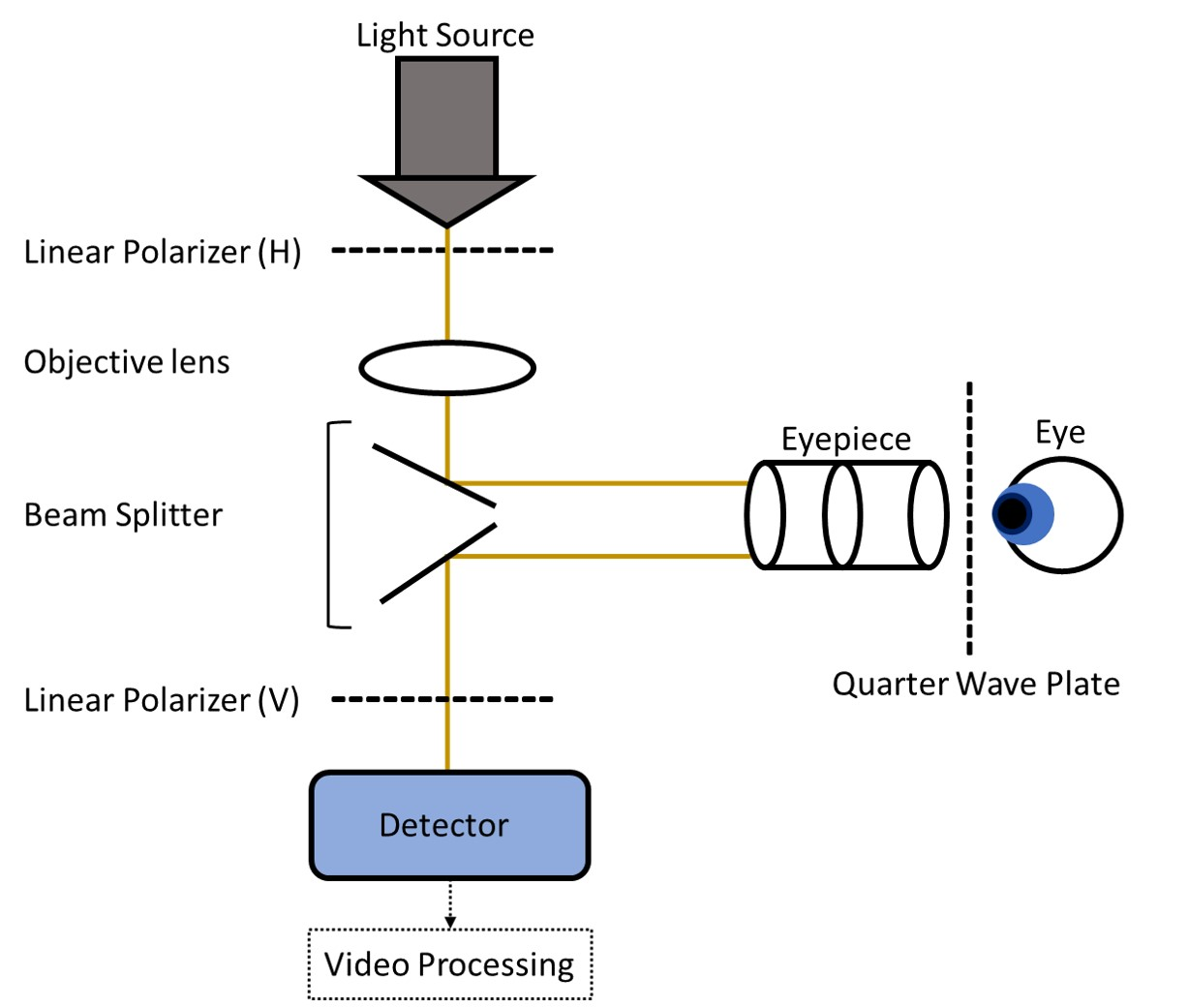
A schematic of the oculometer, depicting the arrangement of the light source, objective lens, beam splitter, two polarizing lenses, detector, and eyepiece.

== General principles ==
Eye movement can be quantified by reflection off the cornea. However, in this case a movement of the head would also cause a movement to be recorded. This can be overcome by either rigidly fixing the head to prevent any movements, however this is intrusive and uncomfortable for the user and not broadly applicable for human research studies. Or, the entire apparatus could be mounted on the head, which likewise is bulky and uncomfortable. A better solution is to measure two parameters, such as corneal reflection and pupil movement (based on pupil center).

=== Optical design ===
The optical design of the oculometer allows normal vision, directs light from a fixed internal source onto the eye of the user, and forms the image of the pupil on a detector. The basic lens design includes a fixed eye piece and an adjustable objective lens followed by 2 beam splitters. The device also consists of a polarization system to polarize the light from the source (typically a glow modulator tube) in the H direction. In order to attenuate the light from the source through reflections in the eyepiece, a linear polarizer in the V direction is placed in the optical path. A quarter wave plate is placed between the eye and the eye piece and rotates the plane of polarization by 90 degrees thus ensuring that the V-polarizer does not attenuate the true corneal reflections.

The light source and detector are aligned coaxially. When the eye moves, the reflection off the cornea is displaced from the pupil center. This displacement is measured by

$D=\kappa*sin \theta$

D is displacement, $\kappa$ is the distance from the center of the cornea, $\theta$ is the angle of inclination of the eye's optical axis to the oculometer.

Near infrared light (NIR) (approximately 750nm to 2,500nm wavelengths) is used for a few reasons. First, NIR light is less detectable to the human eye than other wavelengths of visible light, so the NIR light beam is less intrusive or noticeable to the user. Second, with this configuration the pupil is backlit, resulting in a bright disc, effectively differentiating the pupil from the rest of the eye and face.

Typically, the oculometer consists of an eyepiece through which the user sees. An alternate design exists where the oculometer is head-mounted. This arrangement does not include the traditional eye-piece and user sees through a transparent, curved visor placed in front of his eyes.

=== Electronic design ===
The traditional oculometer operates in two modes: acquisition and tracking modes. When the user first sees through the eye piece, a rough raster scan captures the black pupil and bright reflections from the cornea. Then, the device automatically switches to tracking mode where time-division-multiplex-scans acquires continuous measurements of eye direction. Eye direction from the time-division-multiplex scans are computed by the superposition of the scan positions of corneal reflection and pupil positions. In case of device malfunction or loss in continuity due to the user blinking their eyes, the device switches back to the acquisition mode until tracking is restored. In recent designs, the acquisition mode has been automated to ensure that the pupil/iris boundary was instantly captures once the user sees through the eye piece. The automation also led to automatic switch to tracking mode after initial acquisition was obtained or after the user blinks.

== Applications ==
=== Piloting aircraft ===
There are numerous uses for the oculometer in the field of aviation. One is understanding whether cognitive abilities are sufficient for flight clearance. Further, flight programs can use the oculometer to inform cockpit design in terms of instrumentation panels, by studying the gaze of pilots as they fly. Finally, aviator training has benefitted from the oculometer as well. Understanding how a particular pilot scans through his field of view while flying allows for personalized feedback from flight coaches. It can provide instructors with more information by which to evaluate and further instruct learning pilots. For this reason, NASA and the US Armed Forces have utilized oculometers in their training programs, creating the Oculometer Training Tape Technique in the late 1900s.

=== NASA ===
A NASA research project regarding the oculometer was to realize the ability for a person to control a machine using their eyes, which firstly necessitates eye movement measurements. NASA engineered a telescopic oculometer in which a user looks through an eyepiece, and given that the user can see through the eyepiece, eye movements will be measured.

One particular application of NASA's oculometer endeavor is eye control of an Astronaut Maneuvering Unit (AMU). When an astronaut is in space and would like to move, the AMU facilitates this. However, controlling such a unit is no trivial task. Manual/hand controls are difficult as there are many axes and therefore many muscle outputs needed to coordinate 3D movement. However, eye control would be easier to implement with an oculometer.

=== Cognitive assessment ===
Aviation requires robust, sharp cognitive function, and the eye is part of the central nervous system as they are extensions of the brain, linking cognitive function with healthy eye function. Therefore oculometers can function as cognitive assessment tools.

=== Diagnosis of Parkinson's disease ===
Abnormal eye movements is an established biomarker for numerous motor diseases including Parkinson's disease. Each motor disease is expected to produce different signature pattern of eye movement abnormalities. Using those eye movement patterns both as a diagnostic tool and for monitoring disease progression has therefore been of scientific interest. Oculometers are therefore used in this area for tracking eye movement. The use of oculometers for diagnosis of motor diseases is promising, though it has not yet been validated in the clinic.

For Parkinson's disease specifically, the signature pattern of eye movement abnormalities occur as horizontal saccades (rapid, conjugate, eye movement that shift the center of the vision field). Patients with Parkinson's disease displayed high inabilities in performing antisaccadic tasks (eye movement in the opposite direction from the onset trigger). Measurement of antisaccades therefore enables scientists to detect early stages of Parkinson's disease. These studies are still in the research phase.

=== Smart eyeglasses ===
For this application, the electronic design of the traditional oculometer has been modified to replace complex real-time video processing such that the oculometer could fit on light weight eyeglasses and have relatively long battery life. Smart eyeglasses are used to correct for vision errors due to age-related conditions while restoring normal vision. Smart eyeglasses utilize tunable eyepieces compared to fixed lenses used in conventional glasses.

These glasses work by projecting light from a few different directions using infrared LEDs on the user's eyeball and receives the refracted light from discrete infrared proximity sensors also placed at a few different locations. The use of multiple detectors not only enables oculometers to be used as lightweight wearables but also ensures that signals detected by the sensors are not dependent on external illumination. This property allows the device to be functional in dark conditions. The major disadvantage of the use of sensors compared to continuous video processing is the significant decline in accuracy since measurements are both reduced in frequency and number of measurements.

== Other applications ==
Other potential application of oculometers that are still currently under development include in air traffic control for operators to designate aircraft through eye movement; in laser communication in dynamic situations where operators can transmit signals by looking at the signal; in television systems to monitor the eye direction as it views the television display such that sensory requirements of the eye can be met with lower bandwidths; and in psychological tests to analyze pattern of images that patients tend to avoid.
