= Daniel Starch =

American academic

Daniel Starch (1883–1979) was an American psychologist, educator, and marketing researcher. He was early pioneer in the development of advertising and consumer research in the United States.

== Life ==
Starch earned a BS in mathematics and psychology from Morningside College in Iowa. He then pursued graduate studies at the University of Iowa, where he earned a PhD in psychology in 1906 under the supervision of Charles E. Seashore. After briefly teaching at Iowa, he joined Wellesley College in Massachusetts while continuing his studies at Harvard University.

In 1908, Starch joined the University of Wisconsin, where he taught until 1919. From 1920 to 1926, he was a professor at Harvard University. In 1923, while still at Harvard, he founded the marketing research firm Daniel Starch and Staff. He later resigned from Harvard to devote himself fully to his company and to work in the private sector. In 1932, he also served as a consultant and director of a research department for the American Association of Advertising Agencies. Starch led his company for about 50 years, retiring in 1973 at the age of 90.

== Work ==
Starch wrote extensively on psychology, advertising, and marketing research. Best known are Experiments in Educational Psychology (1911) and his pioneering work about advertising Advertising: Its Principles, Practice, and Technique and its follow-up Principles of Advertising (1923). He researched and devised methods to assess the effectiveness of advertising, among them what was later to become known as the "Starch test" or "Starch recognition procedure". Also named after him is the "Starch formula", which describes how to determine the number of people recalling a full-page advertisement from the number of people recalling a half-page advertisement.

=== Works ===
- Experiments in Educational Psychology (1911)
- Advertising: Its Principles, Practice, and Technique (1914)
- Principles of Advertising (1923)
- with Hazel Martha Stanton, Wilhelmine Koerth, Roger Barton: Controlling Human Behavior: A First Book in Psychology for College Students (1936)
- with Hazel Martha Stanton, Wilhelmine Koerth: Psychology in Education (1941)
- Measuring Advertising Readership and Results (McGraw-Hill, 1966)
- Look Ahead to Life: How to be a Fine Person (Vantage Press, 1973)
- Educational Measurements
- How to Develop your Executive Ability (1943)
