= Exit rate =

Exit rate is a term used in web site traffic analysis and oil and gas production, as well as a financial term. Please, note, there is a difference between exit and bounce rate.

Exit rate as a term used in web site traffic analysis (sometimes confused with bounce rate) is the percentage of visitors to a page on the website from which they exit the website to a different website. The visitors just exited from that specific page.

Exit rate as an Upstream (petroleum industry) term refers to the rate of production of oil and/or gas as of a specified date. Often this will be the projected rate at the next year-end.

Exit rate as a financial term refers to the revenue or cost to be expected in the following fiscal period as a derivative of the performance in the current period.

When used in the context of revenue, exit rate refers to the income expected in following periods as a result of sales closed in the existing period. If a company worked throughout the year and signed deals that will generate a million dollars a year in following years, then the company has a one million dollar per year exit rate in this year.

When used in the context of costs, exit rate refers to the costs expected in following periods as a result of recurring costs taken on during the existing period. If a company took on headcount and recurring costs of a million dollars per year during a given fiscal year, then the working budget for that company would have a cost exit rate of a million dollars per year in that year.
