= Customer insight =

Understanding of an organisation's relationship with its customers and stakeholders

A customer insight, or consumer insight (CI), is an interpretation of trends in human behaviors which aims to increase the effectiveness of a product or service for the consumer, as well as increase sales for the financial benefit of those provisioning the product or service. There is an overlap between market research and customer insights. While market researchers can produce consumer insights, not all insights require market research techniques. The insights can be acquired using competitive intelligence, big data, machine learning, social media listening, geomarketing, and text analytics, as well as market research, predictive analytics and database marketing.

Specifically, consumer insights is a field that focuses on analyzing market research and acting as a bridge between research and marketing departments within a company. Consumer insight is the intersection between the interests of the consumer and the features of a brand. Its main purpose is to understand why the consumer cares for the brand, as well as their underlying mindsets, moods, motivations, desires, and aspirations that motivate and trigger their attitudes and actions.

Insights can be defined through four components:

- Non obvious. There is a need to converge evidence to glean insights.
- Actionable. Insights must relate to actions that firms can implement and act upon
- Change consumer behaviour. An analysis of past behaviour and assuming people will be creatures of habit does not reveal any depth of understanding them, certainly not insight.
- Mutual benefit. The insight must benefit the firm and the consumer.
