= Double jeopardy (marketing) =

Double jeopardy is an empirical law in marketing where, with few exceptions, the lower-market-share brands in a market have both far fewer buyers in a time period and also lower brand loyalty.

The term was originally coined by social scientist William McPhee in 1963 who observed the phenomenon, first in awareness and liking scores for Hollywood actors, and later in behaviours (e.g. reading of comic strips and listening to radio presenters).

Shortly afterwards, Andrew Ehrenberg discovered the double jeopardy law generalised to brand purchasing. Subsequently, double jeopardy has been shown to apply across many categories of product.

This empirical law-like phenomenon is due to a statistical selection effect that occurs if brands are broadly substitutable selling to much of the same types of people (often referred to as a lack of product differentiation and market partitioning). The double jeopardy empirical generalization is explained and predicted by the NBD-Dirichlet theory of repeat purchase. See also Schmittlein, Bemmaor and Morrison (1985).

== Marketing strategy implications ==
The main implication of double jeopardy is that market share growth depends substantially on growing the size of a brand's customer base.

So brand managers of a smaller market share brand should not be reprimanded for lower customer loyalty metrics. Also, they should not be expected to build customer loyalty to the brand without substantially increasing the brand's market penetration.

== Exceptions to double jeopardy ==
There are two potential deviations from double jeopardy, (1) a brand with unusually low penetration and consequently higher loyalty constituting its market share (known as a niche brand), and (2) unusually high penetration and low repeat-purchase rates (known as a change-of-pace brand). Known examples include:

- Retailer brands (private label) – niched, because of their restricted distribution; these brands' market share consists of low penetration and, consequently, unusually high repeat buying.
- Hispanic TV networks in the USA – niched, because most US viewers do not speak Spanish. These networks have few viewers but those viewers watch for an unusually high amount of time, compared to viewers of similarly rating networks.
- Seasonal brands (e.g. chocolate Easter eggs) – for their respective market shares, these brands have an unusually high penetration and low repeat-purchase rates (i.e. they are change-of-pace brands).

These may also be seen as different examples of brands with restricted distribution; each individual retailer brand is only available in one store chain, Hispanic TV channels will only be selected by Spanish speakers (a form of restricted distribution), Easter egg distribution is restricted by time – everywhere but not for very long.
