= Marketing research mix =

The term Marketing research mix (or the "MR Mix") was created in 2004 and published in 2007 (Bradley - see references). It was designed as a framework to assist researchers to design or evaluate marketing research studies. The name was deliberately chosen to be similar to the Marketing Mix - it also has four Ps. Unlike the marketing mix these elements are sequential and they match the main phases that need to be followed. These four Ps are: Purpose; Population; Procedure and Publication.

== Purpose ==
The research purpose defines the rationale for conducting the study. The word “purpose” is useful because it has a wide coverage. It can be specifically defined or it can be loosely explained. The wide term also embraces studies to gather marketing intelligence, where the manager's role is to scan the environment for useful data, and there may be no specific objective.

Many marketers avoid the term hypothesis entirely and tend to use the words “research objective” or “aim”. The word hypothesis (plural, hypotheses) is quite different from the terms mentioned above. It is an essential starting point for quantitative researchers, but takes a lesser role for qualitative researchers. The term is deeply rooted in the history of scientific thought. In statistics we expend much time and energy to generate hypotheses, to test hypotheses, and to reject them. Some people argue that we should only test one hypothesis; others say we should test several. In hypothesis testing we create a statement, which may be true or false, this statement is a "proposition" - we propose that something may be the case. If it is right then we accept it. If it is not right, if it is "wrong" then we reject it.

The first step is to formulate the null-hypothesis, abbreviated to Ho. This is usually intended to be rejected. Another carefully constructed hypothesis is the alternative hypothesis or the H1; this is actually called the 'research hypothesis'. After these have been articulated the researcher can design a research programme to test the hypotheses. When the results are received, they are examined against the prediction of the null hypothesis. The basic idea is to use this possible explanation and then look for data to support the explanation (or not). It is best to spend as much time as possible on the hypothesis: it is the research question, and it determines how the study is carried out. It determines the design because it defines the problem.

The subject of hypothesis testing has been debated heavily for many years and there are suggestions that misuse of null hypothesis significance testing is widespread and damaging (Finch et al. 2001), at least in psychological research. It is relevant to cite an article on hypothesis testing in marketing research by Lawrence (1982) who tells us: "Practical survey researchers (realise) that, in many cases, no adequate theory exists for setting up hypotheses in advance". The article continues: "Drawing one-off hypotheses out of the air offers no solution to the problem. Researchers will be guided by their own ideas, experiences, hunches".

== Population ==
When considering any market sector we need to ask “Who is involved in this marketplace?” Who are the players? Who should be the centre of the investigation and where are those subjects? This area considers the target audience, customer or player; the users or non-users. Who will become the respondent or informant? Should we contact all players or just some of them? Should we carry out a census or a sample: should respondents be selected by probability or non-probability methods? An important concept for primary research is sampling. We choose to interview or observe people who we think will give us the information that will solve our problems. So in choosing our research method, we need to consider whom we select and how we select. This applies to qualitative research, with only a few people, and quantitative research with many people. Much emphasis in marketing research is on the end user, but “experts” can bridge the gap between primary and secondary data. An expert may be someone who has been in the business for many years. This part of the MR Mix involves identifying relevant sampling frames.

== Procedure ==
When considering the procedure the key question is “How should the study be conducted?” Will it be qualitative or quantitative? This area also covers the question of timing: when will the fieldwork take place?

The best research starts by looking at secondary data, this information already exists. The two basic sources: internal (within an organisation) and external, published by someone outside have become easier to access in recent years. Information Technology, with Intranets and the Internet, has improved our ability to find such data. If secondary data doesn't solve the problem then original data (primary data) is sought. It is useful to think of different primary methods in these terms: we can ask people what they are doing; we can watch them or detect what they have done by counting or we can manipulate some variables to discover the effect. This creates three categories: questioning; observation and experimentation.

Primary data collection techniques can be subdivided into: interviewer-administered or respondent-administered; direct or indirect; personal or impersonal. Processing data, analysis and interpretation are essential parts of the procedure. Detailed examination of the appropriate tools used in the data collection needs to take place.

== Publication ==
Under the heading of “Publication” the key questions are: Who is the audience for the results? What should be communicated? When and how should they be communicated? Research is of no use if findings are kept within the research team; similarly commercially sensitive information will have no competitive advantage if placed in the public domain. Choices need to be made on how publication takes place. Will a written report be created? Will tabulations be provided? Will a personal presentation take place? Who should be allowed sight of the results?

There are many different readers of research reports and these audiences all have very different expectations. Reporting must be personalised, writing and presentation style must be customised and adapted to the user. At one extreme there is the general public. There are many reasons why research is reported to the “mass consumer”. It may be a government report that has been commissioned to be in the public interest: concerning health, welfare, transport and so on. It may be a consumer report: consumer watchdog reports are of great interest to the man on the street, so we find the Which? Magazine and similar bodies have enabled the layman appreciate survey findings. Editors of periodicals regularly commission research for editorial reasons, so the results may become part of an article for mass consumption. The research agency may report directly to the public on web pages, by email or by post, this is because it is now common to offer a short summary report to a respondent as a gesture of goodwill, an incentive, a thank you for co-operating in the research. Research findings may appear as part of a promotional campaign, appealing to the consumer's need to know that indeed this is a best seller (“nine out of ten cat-owners prefer…”).

Then there are smaller audiences such as managers who are anxious to receive a report in order to make instant decisions. Additionally there are managers who will benefit from the information much later when the report is consulted as secondary data in the future.

== See also ==
- Market Research proposal writing
- Marketing Strategy
- Marketing Management
- Marketing Plan
- Marketing Mix
- Marketing Effectiveness
- Return on Marketing Investment
