= ESOMAR =

Professional association in market research and insights

Esomar
- Formation: 1947; 79 years ago (Note: ESOMAR itself claims a date of 1947 while there is an alternate claim the date is 1948, the date the ESOMAR guidance code was first published.)
- Headquarters: Amsterdam, Netherlands
- Coordinates: 52.309°N 4.948°E
- Website: esomar.org

Esomar is a global professional association for market research, insights and data analytics that was founded in 1947. The name Esomar was originally an acronym for the "European Society for Opinion and Marketing Research", which reflected the initial European scope of the organisation. Since then, the organisation formally adopted the name "Esomar" as a standalone branding, rather than using Esomar as an acronym, reflecting therefore its international scope that serves members across more than 130 countries. Esomar has published an ethics and self-regulatory guidance code for its members since 1948. A joint international Code of Practice has been published in partnership with the International Chamber of Commerce (ICC) since 1977.

In summary, Esomar develops professional and ethical standards, provides education and networking opportunities, publishes research and guidance, organises industry events, and represents the interests of the data, research and insights sector.

== History ==
Esomar was founded in 1947. In 1948 the first version of its code of practice for members was published. In 1976, Esomar and the ICC determined that a single code of practice would be preferable, leading to the release of the first joint code of practice ICC/ESOMAR code in 1977. Subsequent revisions occurred in 1986, 1994 and 2007 with yet another revision in 2016 revision which expanded the scope to formally include data analytics and modern digital data collection practices.

In 2025, ICC & Esomar published a revised international code addressing developments in data, research and analytics, including artificial intelligence and other emerging technologies.

== Structure and governance ==
Headquartered in Amsterdam, Esomar operates as an international non-profit association. It serves individual researchers, agencies, data analytics firms, academic institutions and corporate clients worldwide. The organisation is governed by an elected Council and a President who serve multi-year terms overseeing strategic direction, standard-setting and compliance with the ethical code.

Council:

The Esomar council serves as the governing board responsible for the strategic direction, financial oversight and legal compliance of the organisation.

- President & Vice-President: Elected by Esomar members for two-year terms to represent the association globally.
- Council Members: Elected members who served alongside the President and the Vice-President to oversee strategic initiatives and represent regional and professional interests across the Insights community.

Executive management:

- Operational leadership is headed by a CEO appointed by the council.

Disciplinary Bodies & Committees:

- Professional Standards Committee: examines complaints concerning alleged breaches and may impose sanctions under Esomar's disciplinary procedures.
- Legal and regulatory affairs: ESOMAR engages with policymakers and other stakeholders on issues affecting data, research and insights.
- Esomar Foundation Board: An independent board of trustees overseeing charitable projects, education grants and development initiatives.

== Industry standards and advocacy ==
- Self-regulation: The ICC/Esomar international code provides a framework for self-regulation in the research and insights industry and has been adopted or endorsed by more than 60 national research associations.
- Regulatory advocacy: Esomar lobbies global lawmakers, notably on EU data legislation like the GDPR, to preserve legitimate statistical research.
- The AI Alliance: A member-driven initiative focused on responsible adoption and governance of artificial intelligence in the data, research and insights sector.

== Activities ==
Esomar produces industry standards, market intelligence, regional reports and research publications on market, opinion, and social research as well as data analytics.

- Events: Esomar holds regional conferences (including APAC, LATAM and North America) and an annual multi-day flagship global congress. These are held in person, except in 2020 and 2021 when they were conducted virtually as "Insights Festival".
- Publications: Research World is an online publication platform sharing original, non-commercial content, methodological research and submissions relevant to the Insights profession. Prior to 2019, Research World was distributed as a print magazine with publisher Wiley Online Library.
- Esomar Foundation: a charitable organisation associated with the research and insights community that supports research-related projects and education
- Awards: Esomar presents several professional recognitions and awards annually, recognising achievements in the data, research and insights sector.

== See also ==
- Insights Association
- American Association for Public Opinion Research (AAPOR)
- World Association for Public Opinion Research (WAPOR)
- European Survey Research Association (ESRA)
- Market Research Society (MRS)

== Sources ==
- Corbin, Ruth M.; et al. (26 November 2018). Practical Guide to Comparative Advertising: Dare to Compare. Academic Press. ISBN 978-0128054710. OCLC 1078666387.
- ESOMAR; Raben, Finn (2019). "About us". esomar.org. Archived from the original on 13 December 2019.
- ICC (2019a). "ICC/ESOMAR International Code on Market and Social Research". ICC. Archived from the original on 13 December 2019.
- ICC (2019b). "ICC/ESOMAR International Code on Market, Opinion and Social Research and Data Analytics". ICC. Archived from the original on 13 December 2019.
- Nilsson, Johan (2018). Constructing Consumer Knowledge in Market Research : An Ethnography of Epistemics (PhD). Linköping Studies in Arts and Sciences. Vol. 735. Linköping University. doi:10.3384/diss.diva-144816. ISBN 978-91-7685-360-3.
- Polonsky, Michael J.; Waller, David S. (31 August 2004). Designing and Managing a Research Project: A Business Student's Guide (1 ed.). SAGE Publications, Inc. ISBN 978-0761922490. OCLC 982525073.
- Wiley (2019). "Research World". Wiley. doi:10.1002/(ISSN)2330-4448. Archived from the original on 13 December 2019.
