= Parent-Child Interaction Assessment-II =

The Parent-Child Interaction Assessment-II (PCIA-II; Holigrocki, Kaminski, & Frieswyk, 1999, 2002) is a direct observation procedure. Parents and 3- to 10-year-old children are videotaped as they play at a make-believe zoo. They are presented with a series of story stems and are asked to "Play out what happens together." Once the story creation part has finished, they complete the PCIA-II Inquiry video-recall procedure where they are shown selections from their videotape. The videotape is paused; and they are individually interviewed regarding what is happening and what each and the other are doing, thinking, feeling, and wanting. The PCIA-II takes approximately 45 minutes to administer (30 minutes for the videotaped interaction and 15 minutes for the Inquiry)

This measure is employed in research and clinical interventions with parent-child dyads. As a research tool, the PCIA-II is used to test hypotheses relevant to clinical psychology, psychiatry, and child development. Clinically, the PCIA-II is used in assessment and treatment. As a psychological assessment measure, information is obtained about parent-child relational functioning and each person's behaviors and cognitions. Videorecordings are analyzed qualitatively and/or quantitatively using a set of parent, child, or relational codes that have demonstrated good psychometric properties (see Holigrocki, 2008). As a treatment, the PCIA-II is a core part of the Modifying Attributions of Parents (PCIA-II/MAP) cognitive-behavioral therapy intervention (Bohr, 2005; Bohr & Holigrocki, 2005). The PCIA-II/MAP begins with the therapist reviewing a PCIA-II pre-treatment recording of the parent and child to identify competency areas as well as areas of parenting difficulties such inaccurate, dysfunctional, or negative attributions. During the intervention sessions, the clinician and parent work together to enhance strengths and recognize and change the parent's attributions. The PCIA-II/MAP is currently being used in treatment and treatment outcome research in Ontario, Canada.

Richard Holigrocki, Patricia Kaminski, Siebolt Frieswyk, George Hough, and Karen Shectman developed the PCIA between 1995 and 1997 at The Menninger Clinic and the measure was updated and revised in 2002 by the first three authors. Peter Fonagy, director of the Menninger Child and Family Center, provided consultation for the project.

Questions under investigation involve studying the influence of psychopathology of the parent or child on the other member of the dyad; child attachment; parental attunement; the relationship between defense mechanisms, internal representations, and aggression; parenting styles; the efficacy of the PCIA-II/MAP intervention; and cross cultural comparisons between samples collected in Hong Kong and the United States.

== See also ==
- Child therapy
- Attachment measures
