= Marketing Research Association =

Non-profit organization

- Abbreviation: MRA
- Formation: 1957
- Headquarters: Washington, D.C.
- Location: United States
- Region served: Worldwide
- Members: 3,000
- Official language: English
- Main organ: Volunteer Board of Directors
- Website: https://insightsassociation.org/

The Marketing Research Association (MRA) merged with Council of American Survey Research Association (CASRO) to form the Insights Association in 2017.

== History ==
MRA was a 501(c)(6) non-profit, membership trade association, incorporated in New York state. It was located in Washington D.C. and founded in 1957.

Members were companies and individuals that specialized in, or had departments that specialized in, market research, consumer opinion and related marketing intelligence.

The MRA's chief product was representing the membership. It was also active in advocating industry positions on legislative and regulatory issues.

=== Membership ===
Membership principally included access to a common code of conduct and set of best practices; industry-related news briefs and publications, including its trade-oriented magazine, Alert; invitation to MRA's annual conference and to meetings of its regional chapters; access to market research videos, online training seminars, papers and directories; access to professional certification; legislative updates; governmental advocacy; and access to an online jobs board. Annual membership dues are dependent on the applicant's company size and relationship to the marketing research industry. Some membership-only products are sold separately (i.e., not included in the annual membership fee). The organization said it has approximately 3,000 members.

=== Conferences ===
MRA held three annual conferences, the Corporate Researchers Conference CRC St. Louis, The Insights & Strategies Conference ISC San Diego and The CEO Summit Napa Valley.

=== Governmental Affairs ===
MRA's Governmental Affairs section monitored statutory and legislative issues that affected market researchers, such as consumer data privacy legislation and court rulings in each of the 50 United States and in other countries, including social media legislation, legal issues pertaining to consumer privacy for medical care and prescriptions (such as HIPAA-related rulings), anti-spam legislation, telephone surveys, political polling, and similar issues. On topics such as the Telephone Consumer Protection Act (TCPA) of 1991, the Federal Trade Commission's (FTC) and Department of Commerce's support of rules restricting access to consumer data, and various Congressional consumer privacy acts, the MRA publicly advocated (i.e., lobbies legislators and other governmental officials to adopt) positions that support the organization's goals. Opposition to these positions generally came from consumer rights organizations and their lobbyists.

=== Professional education ===
The University of Georgia's online course, "Principles of Marketing Research," is based on an MRA-developed curriculum entitled "Market Research Core Body of Knowledge." Scholarships for this course were provided annually by the MRA to one or more qualifying applicants. The Marketing Research Association also offered a Professional Researcher Certificate (PRC) administered through the organization's website. Both of these programs were open to members at additional cost. Following the merger, the Market Research Professionals Certification Association (MRPCA) offered free continuing education.

=== Board of directors ===
The MRA Board of Directors included Jill Donahue, Chairman of the Board; Debby Schlesinger-Hellman, PRC, Immediate Past Chairman; Ted Donnelly, Ph.D., PRC, Vice Chair, Vaughn Mordecai, PRC, Treasurer; Dan Womack, PRC, Secretary; and David W. Almy, Chief Executive Officer. The Board also included six Directors at Large: Scott Baker, PRC, Janet Baldi, Jim Bryson, Jerry Haselmayer, Jeffrey Henning, PRC and Elizabeth Merrick.
