= Market research =

Type of business activity

Market research is an organized effort to gather information about target markets and customers. It involves understanding who they are and what they need. It is an important component of business strategy and a major factor in maintaining competitiveness. Market research helps identify and analyze market needs, market size and the competition. Its techniques encompass both qualitative techniques such as focus groups, in-depth interviews, and ethnography, as well as quantitative techniques such as customer surveys, and analysis of secondary data.

It includes social and opinion research, and is the systematic gathering and interpretation of information about individuals or organizations using statistical and analytical methods and techniques of the applied social sciences to gain insight or support decision making.

Market research, marketing research, and marketing are a sequence of business activities; sometimes these are handled informally.

The field of marketing research is much older than that of market research. Although both involve consumers, Marketing research is concerned specifically about marketing processes, such as advertising effectiveness and salesforce effectiveness, while market research is concerned specifically with markets and distribution. Two explanations given for confusing Market research with Marketing research are the similarity of the terms and also that Market Research is a subset of Marketing Research. Further confusion exists because of major companies with expertise and practices in both areas.

== History ==
Although market research started to be conceptualized and put into formal practice during the 1930s as an offshoot of the advertising boom of the Golden Age of radio in the United States, this was based on 1920s work by Daniel Starch. Starch "developed a theory that advertising had to be seen, read, believed, remembered, and most importantly, acted upon, in order to be considered effective." Advertisers realized the significance of demographics by the patterns in which they sponsored different radio programs.

The Gallup Organization helped invent the public opinion poll; today, "Market research is a way of paying for it."

In the 1940's the first idea for qualitative research was born through the work of Paul Lazarsfeld and his Focus interviews in an effort to test reactions to anti-Nazi radio broadcasts on behalf of the Office of War Information.

Ernest Dichter was the first in the 1950s to coin was is today viewed as motivational consumer research to uncover deep-underlying product values through in-depth consumer interviews.

In the 1960's Predictive statistical techniques were born through the work of Marketing Professor Paul Green who invented conjoint analysis.

In 1974, Jerry Yoram Wind launched the two-step market segmentation model, based on macro-and micro-segmentation, which is still routinely used today.

The Dot.com boom of the 90's changed the market research methods and approaches substantially, with online surveys bypassing face-to-face interviews and phone-interviews as the dominant methodology. The subsequent web analytics and e-Commerce era allowed businesses to begin tracking consumer behavior and transactions online.

== Industry Size and growth perspective ==
Today, the global market research industry generates $150 billion (revenue by the end of 2025), with a projected annual growth of around 8.4%. The leading revenue-generating Markets are the US with $48 billion in market research turnover, the UK with $9.1 billion and China with $2.88 billion.

== Data collection ==
"Rigorous sampling methodologies combined with high-quality data collection" is what the magazine Advertising Age considers the backbone of market research. Data collection can be done by observing customer behavior through in-situ studies or by processing e.g. log files, by interviewing customers, potential customers, stakeholders, or a sample of the general population. The data can be quantitative in nature (counting sales, clicks, eye-tracking) or qualitative (surveys, questionnaires, interviews, feedback). Aggregating, visualizing, and turning data into actionable insights is one of the major challenges of market research and today, text analytics affords market researches methods to process large amounts of qualitative information and turn it into quantitative data, which is easier to visualize and use for formalized decision making.

Data collection can use larger audience samples than the few hundred or thousand typically used in market research. Also required is the (at least passive) cooperation of those being surveyed; trust is also helpful. Translation is an essential comprehension tool for global consumers and is not a simple act of replacing words in one language with words in another.

Some data collection is incentivized: a simple form is when those on the road contribute to traffic reporting of which they are consumers. More complex is the relationship of consumer-to-business (C2B), which sometimes introduces reliability problems. Other data collection is to know more about the market, which is the purpose of market research.

== Market research methods and approaches ==
Market Research generally breaks down into 8 core specializations, subdivided into quantitative and qualitative methods to help drive strategic decision-making:

1. Consumer research explores behaviours, motivations, pain points and consumption habits. They are traditionally covered through qualitative methods such as in-depth-interviews, focus groups or ethnographic observations or quantitative methods such as survey, A/B-testing or coinjoint analysis.
2. Market segmentation divides broad markets into subset of consumers that share similar characteristics, such as demographics, psychographics, locations. It allows to personalized marketing campaigns and do precise audience targeting.
3. Competitor research investigates the strengths, weaknesses, strategies and positioning of main competitors. It helps identify blue oceans and finesse positioning and USP.
4. Product research, such as product, concept or pack-testing, to ensure that the planned products meets consumer's needs and functionalities.
5. Brand research, such as large and ongoing Brand equity trackers help measure Brand perception, awarness and recall (aided or unaided)
6. Pricing Research methods help evaluate price elasticity, willingness of the consumer to pay more and ideal price points versus competitive product. It is used to maximize business gains while still maintaining consumer satisfaction.
7. Advertising research is used to test Campaign copy, visual and messaging prior to launch a campaign
8. Customer satisfaction/ experience research interrogates customers on their experience, loyalty and future purchase intent with the aim to identify areas for upselling and increase retention. The NPS score is a widely used metric.

== The Impact of AI on the Market Research industry ==
Artificial intelligence and machine learning are fundamentally shifting the industry from slow, manual process data-processing and reactive reporting to real-time, deeper insights, faster analysis and more accurate predictions. According to Dr Alka Singh Bhatt "Artificial Intelligence in Marketing is a rapidly emerging field that is transforming the way businesses approach their marketing strategies. With the explosion of data and the increasing complexity of customer behavior, businesses need to leverage these tools to stay competitive". The University of Leeds has stated that Artificial Intelligence can improve business efficiency by reducing costs by 30% by 2035 and that AI-powered chatbots cut response times by 60% and customer service costs by 50%.

AI (artificial intelligence) and ML (Machine Learning) have the ability to process the 2.5 quintillion bytes of data produced daily analysing it 100 times faster than traditional methods with a precision that would be impossible with traditional research methods.

Experts warn that data quality needs to be prioritized and that AI should never be a replacement but an additional layer on top of a rigorous survey-design.

Different use cases for ML and AI in market research:

- ML algorithm can analyse historical data to forecast sales, anticipate market trends and understand evolving consumer preferences.
- Advanced sentiment analysis use natural language processing (NLP) techniques to understand the feeling, tone, and emotion of online conversations.
- Data-science powered capabilities like image analysis, scene recognition, and logo detection provide critical context about visual content.
- Digital Twins or synthetic audiences simulate real respondents to help predict how they would react to a specific concept, price or campaign.

== Research and market sectors ==
Regarding details for worldwide corporate market research, "most of them are never written about because they are the consumer research done by the country's manufacturers." Also less written about is tailored translation approaches based on the expertise or resources available in the local country. To mitigate implicit and unconscious bias in market research design, researchers have suggested conducting bias testing via interviewer-moderated technology-aided, unmoderated methods.

Market research data has loss prevention aspects; that less than 60 percent of all proposed modifications and new products are deemed failures. When information about the market is difficult to acquire, and the cost of "going ahead with the decision" to offer the product or service is affordable, the research cost may be more profitably used "to ensure that the new line got the advertising send-off it needed to have the best chances of succeeding."

=== Market research for the film industry ===
The film industry is an example where the importance of testing film content and marketing material involves:

1. Concept testing, which evaluates reactions to a film idea and is fairly rare;
2. Positioning studios, which analyze a script for marketing opportunities;
3. Focus groups, which probe viewers' opinions about a film in small groups prior to release;
4. Test screenings, which involve the previewing of films prior to theatrical release;
5. Tracking studies, which gauge (often by telephone polling) an audience's awareness of a film on a weekly basis prior to and during theatrical release;
6. Advertising testing, which measures responses to marketing materials such as trailers and television advertisements;
7. Exit surveys, that measure audience reactions after seeing the film in the cinema.

== Insights industry ==
Market research is an industry that overlaps with and is often referred to as the "insights" industry. However, the distinctive methods and techniques of market research not always correspond to the digital-first approach of insights vendors. The emergence of insights focusing on data analytics rather than fieldwork is competing with market research for managerial attention and funding. Current research with market research practitioners shows two pressing concerns for the industry: online data commoditization and the increasing distance between market researchers and top management within client organizations. Both concerns boil down to the risk they perceived of market research becoming a legacy activity of the marketing department rather than the cornerstone of business strategy.

Market research aims to produce so-called "actionable knowledge" that firms find useful in their operations:

1. Framing managerial anomalies: an anomaly is a puzzle or a perplexing situation that the market research report is meant to solve.
2. Loading instruments with meanings: translate observations of commonplace social practices into the marketing ontology.
3. Signposting prescriptions: guide an intended reading to reduce interpretive flexibility.

== Academic journals ==
- International Journal of Market Research
- Qualitative Market Research
- Marketing Theory

== See also ==
- ESOMAR - European Society for Opinion and Marketing Research
- Marketing Research Institute International
- Insights Association
- Mystery shopping
- Nielsen ratings
