= Qualitative marketing research =

Qualitative marketing research involves the naturalistic or observational study of the philosophies and motivations that influence consumer behavior. The direction and framework of such research are often revised as new information emerges, allowing researchers to examine issues in depth. The quality of the findings depends heavily on the researcher’s skill and may be influenced by researcher bias.

== Data collection ==
Qualitative marketing researchers collect data ranging from focus group, case studies, participant observation, innovation game and in-depth interviews.

=== Focus group ===
The focus group is a marketing research technique for qualitative data that involves a small group of people (6–10) that share a common set characteristic (demographics, attitudes, etc.) and participate in a discussion of predetermined topics led by a moderator. There are opportunities to conduct focus groups with the use of focus group software. There are many types of focus groups as well, but they always involve discussion among the group(s). The problem of the focus group is the issue of observer dependency: the results obtained are influenced by the researcher or their own reading of the group's discussion, raising questions of validity. Non-verbal cues, which may contradict the views participants articulate, are important and can easily be missed if the researcher is not familiar with visual cues, body language, and other non-verbal cues. In cross-cultural focus groups, researchers must take into account cultural norms of communication and interaction patterns.

=== Qualitative case study ===
Qualitative case study methodology provides tools for researchers to study complex phenomena within their contexts. Because it only studies one case, it is very up-close and in-depth. It contains high levels of internal validity (the extent to which one is able to say that no other variables except the one being studied caused the result), but the external validity is low. Customer behavior is a good example of qualitative market research.

=== Participation observation ===
Participant observation is watching participants' behavior in real-world settings without trying to manipulate their actions. This method is high in external validity but low in internal validity.

=== Innovation game ===
Innovation game refers to a form of primary market research developed by Luke Hohmann, where customers play a set of directed games as a means of generating feedback about a product or service. A facilitator explains the game(s) to be played and controls the pace, monitors the participants' levels and manages the time. There are many types of innovation games, such as 20/20 vision, me and my shadow, and buy a feature.

=== In-depth interviews ===
In-depth interviews, also called IDIs, have been an integral component of market research since its inception in the 1920s. This method is useful when you want detailed information about a person's thoughts and behaviors or want to explore new issues in depth. One can get unique points from each respondent, and their answers will not be influenced by other people as in a focus group. In-depth interviews are typically held one-on-one between the respondent and the interview via a telephone, conducted in person, by email, or through an online platform (increasingly common).

The primary advantage of in-depth interviews is the amount of detailed information provided as compared to other data collection methods, such as surveys. Another advantage is reaching respondents that are geographically dispersed, which cannot occur in a focus group. This method is often used to refine future research or provide context to future studies. The primary disadvantage of in-depth interviews is the time to conduct, transcribe, and analyze. As such, this method could have higher costs associated with it than other methods.

== Uses ==
Qualitative market research is often part of survey methodology, including telephone surveys and consumer satisfaction surveys. We apply the qualitative market research when:

- New product idea generation and development
- Investigating current or potential product/service/brand positioning and marketing strategy
- Strengths and weaknesses of products/brands
- Understanding dynamics of purchase decision dynamics
- Studying reactions to advertising and public relations campaigns, other marketing communications, graphic identity/branding, package design, etc.
- Exploring market segments, such as demographic and customer groups
- Assessing the usability of websites or other interactive products or services
- Understanding perceptions of a company, brand, category and product
- Mitigating implicit and unconscious bias in market research surveys

== Differences between consumer and B2B qualitative research ==
Qualitative research is used in both consumer research and business-to-business (B2B) research. However, qualitative research methods are used depending on whether consumers or business decision-makers are being inter-viewed. In consumer research, a range of qualitative methods are used, particularly in-depth interviews, focus groups and ethnographic observation.

In B2B research, focus groups and ethnographic observation are used far less frequently due to the nature of business decision-makers, and in-depth interviews are most frequently used in B2B research:

- Time-poor business decision-makers often don't have time to attend in-person focus groups, or for observation techniques that require a lot of time to set-up.
- Many B2B decision-makers work within offices that have strict security/privacy regulations. Also, many are par-ticipating in the research in their own time, and don't necessarily want colleagues to know they are taking part in the study. As a result, face-to-face techniques which require interviewers to attend their offices (e.g., face-to-face interviews or observation) are often not realistic.
- The target audience for a study is often small and spread across multiple locations – getting respondents in one place for a face-to-face focus group can often be unrealistic.
- Decision-makers can often be unwilling to share confidential information in front of potential competitors, so group activities that require multiple people from the same sector don't work.

== Typical general procedure ==
1. Setting the question
2. Deciding the objectives
3. Planning research design
4. Select data collection techniques
5. Sample design
6. Data collection
7. Analysis
8. Do the report

== Advantages ==
- More detailed and in-depth questions
- Reduced cost, since the scale of this kind of research is small
- Discovering the "why" behind certain behaviors
- Quick turnaround: the direction of the research can be changed easily

== Disadvantages ==
- Issues on confidentiality and anonymity can pose problems during presentation of findings.
- If researcher does not have enough skills such as communication skill, the quality of research is likely to be low.
- The sample size is relatively small, the result may not be very accurate.
- Qualitative research produces large amounts of data which requires a tremendous amount of work and labor on the part of the researcher.

== Vs. quantitative marketing research ==
=== Objective ===
Qualitative research is usually aimed to have an inside look about opinions or motivations, while quantitative research uses data to simplify the result.

=== Sample ===
Qualitative research usually has a smaller sample size than quantitative research due to the complexity of its data.

=== Data collection ===
Qualitative research usually uses unstructured or semi-structured techniques to collect data, e.g. in-depth interviews or group discussions, while quantitative research only uses structured techniques such as online questionnaires, on-street or telephone interviews.

=== Outcome ===
The outcomes of qualitative marketing research are usually not conclusive and cannot be used to make generalizations about the population of interest, instead developing an initial understanding and sound base for further decision making. The findings of quantitative marketing research are conclusive and usually descriptive in nature.

== Data analysis ==
=== Coding ===
Coding is an interpretive technique that both organizes the data and provides a means to introduce the interpretations of it into certain quantitative methods.

=== Cross tabulation ===
Cross tabulation divides raw data into subgroups, showing how each dependent variable changes when represented in each subgroup. This is typically the most used data analysis tool due to its ability to clarify how data variables relate to each other.

== See also ==
- Focus group
- Innovation game
- Online panel
- Qualitative data analysis
- Qualitative psychological research
