= Insights Association =

Not-for-profit organization

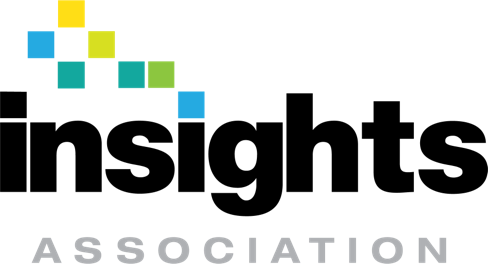
- Abbreviation: IA
- Formation: 2017; 8 years ago
- Merger of: CASRO, Marketing Research Association
- Type: Professional association
- Headquarters: Washington, D.C., United States
- Website: insightsassociation.org

The Insights Association (IA) is a not-for-profit trade association representing the U.S. insights, market research and data analytics industry.

IA empowers more than 30,000 data and insights professionals, serving as the leading voice for those who transform data into understanding. Guided by principles of ethics and truth, its mission is to bring clarity to an uncertain world through advocacy, education, and community.

Through tireless advocacy, IA works to ensure the insights and analytics profession can evolve and thrive—shielding the industry from harmful regulation while promoting governance, rigor, and ethical standards. Membership connects professionals and organizations to a trusted network supported by education, certification, and resources that uphold transparency, quality, and trust.

IA is headquartered in Washington, D.C. and also operates six regional U.S. chapters and one Canadian chapter. Its members annually reaffirm their adherence to the enforceable IA Code of Standards and Ethics for Market Research and Data Analytics, which sets the benchmark for professional and ethical conduct across the industry.

CIRQ (the Certification Institute for Research Quality) is a wholly-owned IA subsidiary which serves as an ISO-accredited auditing and certification body that provides assessment and certification services to research and insights organizations in accordance with international standards such as ISO 20252:2019, ISO/IEC 27001:2022, and ISO/IEC 27701:2019.

Impact begins with insight. Insight begins with the Insights Association. Know what’s next.

== History ==
The Insights Association was established in January 2017 through the merger of two legacy industry associations: the Council of American Survey Research Organizations (CASRO; established in 1975) and the Marketing Research Association (MRA; established in 1957).

CASRO served as an industry trade association and offered corporate memberships to both providers and internal corporate research departments within the market research industry. Their focus was on government affairs, standards, and best practices. MRA, a professional society, offered individual memberships and leaned into professional development, community, and connecting brands with agencies. Their merger resulted in a single, unified association dedicated to fully and protecting and representing the needs of today’s insights ecosystem in the U.S.

== See also ==
- American Association for Public Opinion Research (AAPOR)
- ESOMAR (European Society for Opinion and Marketing Research)
- World Association for Public Opinion Research (WAPOR)
- European Survey Research Association (ESRA)
