= Market Research Society =

British professional body for market research

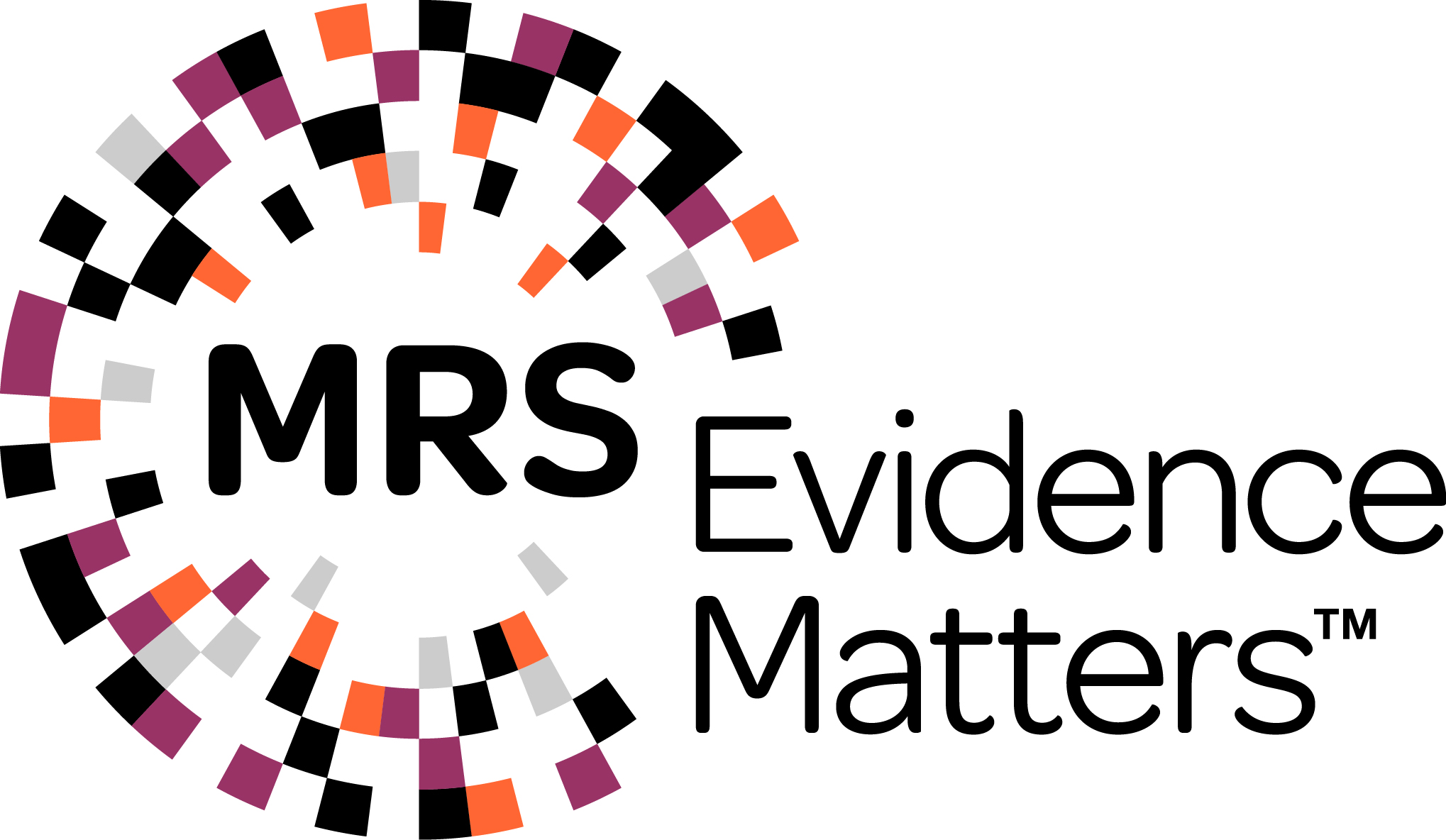
The MRS logo

The Market Research Society (MRS) is a professional body for market research based in London, England. It was established in 1946 at the offices of the London Press Exchange. It represents the views of its members to government and in the press.

MRS recognises 5,000 individual members and over 500 accredited Company Partners in over 50 countries. As the regulator, they promote the highest professional standards throughout the sector via the MRS Code of Conduct. MRS is the world’s largest association serving those with professional equity in provision or use of market, social and opinion research, and in business intelligence, market analysis, customer insight and consultancy.

In 2015, it jointly ran an inquiry with the British Polling Council into the failings of polling before the British general election of that year. The inquiry found that the failure of polling to correctly predict the result was the result of unrepresentative polling samples.

== History ==
The Market Research Society was born on the 5th of November, 1946 in the offices of the London Press Exchange. With 23 founder members, the early meetings operated as a luncheon club where practitioners of market research met to learn the business and maintain an understanding of industry developments. In 1954, The Society adopted its first Code of Standards – covering ethics, reporting and survey standards. 1957 saw the first Conference held in Brighton. The first volume of the Journal of the Market Research Society was published in 1959. In 1977 the MRS Secretariat moved to larger offices at 15 Belgrave Square, London. A few years later in 1986, the Society Secretariat moved to 175 Oxford Street, London as the total membership reached 5,247. In 1990, MRS purchased its current headquarters at 15 Northburgh Street where it remains today.

== Other initiatives ==
MRS has support services for professionals and organisations to stay connected.

- Research Live − industry news, opinion, special reports and feature articles for market and social researchers, data analysts and consumer insight professionals.
- Research Buyer’s Guide − used by client researchers and procurement professionals, RBG is the source of accredited research suppliers in the UK and Ireland.
- Fair Data − a data compliance mark enabling consumers to make educated choices about their personal data.
- Research Jobfinder − a specialist job board for the insight sector, with approximately 700 jobs.
- International Journal of Market Research − a source of information for best practice and new thinking in market research.
- Impact Magazine − quarterly magazine on research, insight and business intelligence.
- Training in market research − the MRS offers training in quantitative and qualitative research techniques and approaches. These can be used as part of the MRS's CPD programme which seeks to promote professionalism in the market research sector.

== Position holders and notable members ==
- Jane Frost, CBE, CEO of MRS.
- Debrah Harding, Managing Director. Debrah joined MRS in 1999 to establish a new Standards and Policy department.
- Jan Gooding, president since 1 April 2017.
- Phyllis Macfarlane, Chair.
- Gerald Goodhardt, a chairman (1973–74) and vice president (1974–77) of the Market Research Society, and Gold Medalist in 1969 and 1996.
