= Kantar TNS =

Market research company

- Type: Wholly owned subsidiary
- Industry: Marketing
- Founded: 1997; 29 years ago
- Headquarters: London, England, UK
- Key people: Richard Ingleton (CEO, Kantar, Insights Division); James Brooks (COO, Kantar, Insights Division); Dave Sandberg (CFO, Kantar, Insights Division); Will Galgey (CEO UK); Chris Riquier (CEO Asia Pacific)
- Services: Market research
- Revenue: £1,068 million (2007)
- Operating income: ▲£102.7 million (2007)
- Net income: ▲£58.5 million (2007)
- Owner: Kantar Group
- Number of employees: 15,270 (2007)
- Website: www.tnsglobal.com

Kantar TNS is a global market research and market information group with offices in over 80 countries. Formerly listed on the London Stock Exchange and a constituent of the FTSE 250 Index, the firm was acquired by WPP Group for £1.6 billion in October 2008, when it became part of WPP's Kantar Group.

In April 2019, Kantar announced that it was unifying all its legacy brands (including Kantar TNS) and consolidating all services and offerings under the Kantar brand name.

== History ==
The history of TNS as a market research company began in 1946 with the establishment of National Family Opinion (NFO) in the United States. Since then, various mergers and acquisitions involving large companies from the US, Europe, and Asia Pacific eventually became the Taylor Nelson Sofres group.

=== Six original companies ===
The 1960s saw the establishment of the six main companies that today form part of TNS. Starting with NFO in the 1940s, Intersearch in the US in 1960; then AGB in the UK in 1962; Sofres in France in 1963; Frank Small Associates (FSA) in Australia in 1964; Taylor Nelson in the UK in 1965. Over the 60s, 70s, 80s and 90s, these companies grew significantly as individual businesses.

The 1990s and early years of the new millennium saw consolidation in the industry. In 1991 AGB and Taylor Nelson merged to create Taylor Nelson AGB. In 1992, Sofres acquired Secodip. In 1997, Sofres combined with FSA. In 1997, Sofres acquired Intersearch and then merged with Taylor Nelson AGB, thus creating TNS.

In 1998 Taylor Nelson Sofres acquired Chilton Market Research, followed by CMR in 2000, and the NFO WorldGroup in 2003.

In 2006, a class action lawsuit was filed against TNS alleging that it failed to disclose major financial information in a registration statement associated with the company's secondary offering.

TNS logo that was used between 2003-2012

The TNS Group continues to grow, mainly by acquiring small research companies to strengthen its position in markets in which it already has a presence. For example, in December 2007, TNS acquired Landis Strategy & Innovation in the United States, a specialist research-based consultancy. In the same month, TNS announced that it had reached agreement to increase its ownership of LatinPanel Holdings from 33.3% to 100%. TNS was formerly a joint venture partner with the NPD Group and the IBOPE Group in this continuous consumer panel business serving Latin America operating in 15 countries in Latin America, and covering 96% of the region’s GDP, providing local and international clients with access to a household research panel across the packaged groceries, toiletries and cosmetics, fresh foods and textile retail markets.

In early March 2008, TNS announced the merging of its North American operating units TNS Media Intelligence, TNS Media Research with the recently acquired firms Compete and Cymfony to create TNS Media Group.

On 29 April 2008 TNS announced that it was in talks to merge with German market research company GfK. The announcement was followed in May by two conditional offers from WPP to buy TNS for a combination of cash and shares, both of which were rejected by TNS’s board. The hostile WPP bid led to GfK and TNS abandoning their merger plans. GfK sought without success to find backing for a rival offer, leaving WPP’s hostile bid as the only one on the table. On 9 October 2008 WPP declared that its latest bid had been successful and that it was buying TNS for $1.93bn.

TNS was bought by WPP's Kantar Group. Many Kantar subsidiary companies underwent restructuring and rebranding.

In 2013, TNS acquired Sinotrust Market Research, a leading market research and consulting company in China.

On 8 September 2016, TNS was rebranded as Kantar TNS.

On 2 April 2019, Kantar announced that it was retiring the names of its brands (including Kantar TNS) and consolidating all services and offerings under the Kantar brand name.

== Operations ==
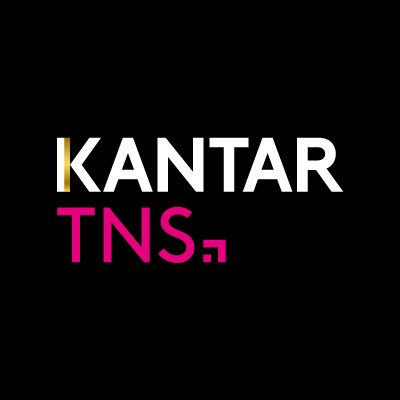
Dpo53ZWY 400x400

TNS NIPO is a Dutch survey agency. Together with Synovate (formerly Interview-NSS) and Surveys from Maurice de Hond (Peil.nl), it is one of the top three (political) survey agencies in the Netherlands. In June 2013, TNS NIPO received the MOAward for Market Research Office of the Year.

TNS is structured around specific areas of marketing: Brand & Communication; Innovation & Product Development; Retail & Shopper; Customer Experience; Employee Engagement; Qualitative; Automotive; and Political & Social.

TNS separates its worldwide operations in over eighty three countries into a number of regional divisions: North America; Northern Europe; Southern Europe; Asia Pacific; Latin America; and Africa, Mediterranean and Middle East.

== Methods ==
TNS NIPO has a database of thousands of screened respondents. For each survey a selection is made from the database and submitted to the respondents. TNS NIPO's goal is to have the respondents surveyed once every six weeks.

TNS NIPO uses software from NIPO Software for its research surveys. The five following methods of research are used:

- CATI: Computer-assisted telephone interviewing
- CAPI: computer-assisted personal interviewing (by interviewer)
- CASI: computer-assisted self interviewing (respondent receives questions via modem)
- CAWI: computer-assisted web interviewing (respondent visit site)
- Qualitative research

The appropriate research form depends on the subject and target group.

== Logo ==
In 2003, when company went from being Taylor Nelson Sofres with several local names to one unified TNS, a new logo was designed. Wolff Olins was the agency behind the 2003 rebrand. Daniella Meirelles, a Brand Consultant at Wolff Olins was the one who brought the global project to the agency. Then in early 2012 the old logo was altered further.

== See also ==
- Official statistics
- Data mining
- Cold calling
- Custom online panel
