= Nebu Global =

Dutch software development company

Nebu
- Type: private limited
- Industry: IT, Software Developer, marketing research, market research, data collection, CATI, WAPI, CAPI, mixed mode, multi mode,
- Founded: 1992 in Uitgeest, Netherlands
- Founder: Fred Broers, Eric van Velzen
- Headquarters: Wormer, Netherlands
- Area served: Worldwide
- Products: Dub InterViewer; Nebu Dialer as a Service; Nebu Data Hub; Nebu Reporter
- Website: nebu.com

Nebu b.v. (Nasdaq: NEBU) is a Dutch software development company. It provides a component based software system for marketing research and data collection. Nebu also provides technical support, hosting and training. Its main target industries are marketing, market research and opinion poll research. Nebu tools provide data collection, panel management, dialing services, data management and data processing capabilities. Nebu provides the technology that helps marketing researchers integrate and automate the full marketing research process within a single suite of tools.

For over 25 years, the company has provided fieldwork and marketing research companies with Nebu Dub InterViewer. Users can conduct CATI, CAPI, WAPI (online surveys and mobile surveys), multi and mixed mode interviews. Data collected can be enriched with data from external sources and stored in the central management platform Nebu Data Hub.

The Head Office is located in Wormer, Netherlands and the company has additional offices in Debrecen, Hungary, and London, United Kingdom. The company works with a network of partners and resellers.

== History ==
The company was established in 1992 as a joint initiative of Fred Broers and Eric van Velzen. As a tribute to an old Babylonian God they chose Nebu (God of writing and wisdom) as their company's name.

Nebu published two cooperating software systems called Dub Knowledge and Dub InterViewer. The prefix "Dub" relates to the Babylonian word for a clay tablet that the god used to write down the destiny of the people. Apart from these main products, numerous other tools were developed over the years and added to the packages. All of their names also start with "Dub".

As of 2015, Nebu employed 40 staff members and had a revenue of over $3 million.

Nebu now has over 150 licensed users of their software, including companies in the Market Research Industry and governmental organizations.
