= Nipo =

Nipo may refer to:

== People ==
- Nipo T. Strongheart (1891–1966), American lecturer

== Places ==
- Nipo (hill), Norway
- Nipo (mountain), Norway

== Organisations ==
- NIPO
- TNS Nipo

== See also ==
- Nipo-peruano, Peruvian citizens of Japanese origin or ancestry
