= Expert report =

An expert report is a study written by one or more authorities that states findings and offers opinions.

In law, expert reports are generated by expert witnesses offering their opinions on points of controversy in a legal case and are typically sponsored by one side or the other in a litigation in order to support that party's claims. The reports state facts, discuss details, explain reasoning, and justify the experts' conclusions and opinions.

In medicine, an expert report is a critical assessment of a medical topic, for example, an independent assessment of the cost–benefit ratio of a particular medical treatment.

As part of survey pretesting, an expert report (using the expert review method) identifies potential problems that could affect data quality and data collection by evaluating survey questionnaires and survey translations.

== See also ==
- Forensic science
