= Cognitive holding power =

Cognitive holding power is a concept introduced and measured by John C. Stevenson in 1994 using a questionnaire, the Cognitive Holding Power Questionnaire (CHPQ). This tool assesses first- or second-order cognitive processing preferences as a result of the characteristics of the learning environment.

== Impact ==
Studies involving cognitive holding power have been able to suggest improvements to mathematical education.
