= Syrian Hurriyat =

The Syrian Hurriyat was the first underground newspaper in Syria published after the Syrian Civil War. The 12-page newspaper has been published weekly since late August 2012. It was founded by young Syrians living inside Syria and in exile in Europe, features writing from a dozen activists around the globe. The Syrian Hurriyat has news reports, editorials, and cartoons.

Later on, an online version was produced and some of the articles are translated into English. However, the priority is the newspaper itself, say its editors, because many in Syria do not have access to an Internet connection. Therefore, the printed version of the newspaper is widely distributed in major cities in Syria, such as Damascus (the capital), Homs and Aleppo.

The 12-pages weekly newspaper (as it was launched at first) is edited by pioneer reporters, defied the long-felt fear by Syrian journalists, to express the voice of the people taking the streets. "Hurriyat" aims to connect with all segments of the Syrian society, particularly those supportive of the government. In addition to providing a review of the week’s events on the streets in Syria, it offers analysis of the current economic and social sectors in Syrian cities and towns, and a forecast of developments in both these sectors in the near and far futures, along with the simultaneous development in the Syrian political sector.

"We want to motivate protesters and keep their spirits high...but also give all Syrians an alternative to the mainstream, state-controlled media. Our publishing approach is based on the instantaneous changes on the Syrian streets, where reports and investigations are subject to the vision of the street, particularly the so-called ‘silent majority,’ which is not ‘silent’ in reality, but instead has an opinion and a vision, which are taking shape every day and must be taken into account," says Kareem Lailah, editor-in-chief of Hurriyat.

Hurriyat has been also initiating and participating in several human rights campaigns and defending freedom of speech, calling for release of detained journalists everywhere within the Arab Spring countries by issuing statements, writing letters and signing petitions. A well known event initiated by Hurriyat was "Campaign to document the crime of the regime against humanity", to verify evidences and document war crimes of Syrian government of Bashar al-Assad against the Syrian population.

Weeks after its launch, Syrian Hurriyat has extended its content on 16 then 20 pages of written materials, include articles, knowledge-rich analysis on peaceful struggle, cartoons, photos and social media based content.
