= Management Position Description Questionnaire =

The Management Position Description Questionnaire (MPDQ) is a questionnaire used in human resource management for the purpose of analysing management positions. It allows HR departments to establish training requirements, salary bands and job groupings for new posts. It has 208 items grouped in 13 categories. These categories also include 197 performance elements. Due to its narrative format, the MPDQ generally requires some degree of training before it can be properly used. The questionnaire was created by Walter W. Tornow and Patrick R. Pinto in 1976.
