= Priest of Cadiz =

Archaeological artifact found in Spain

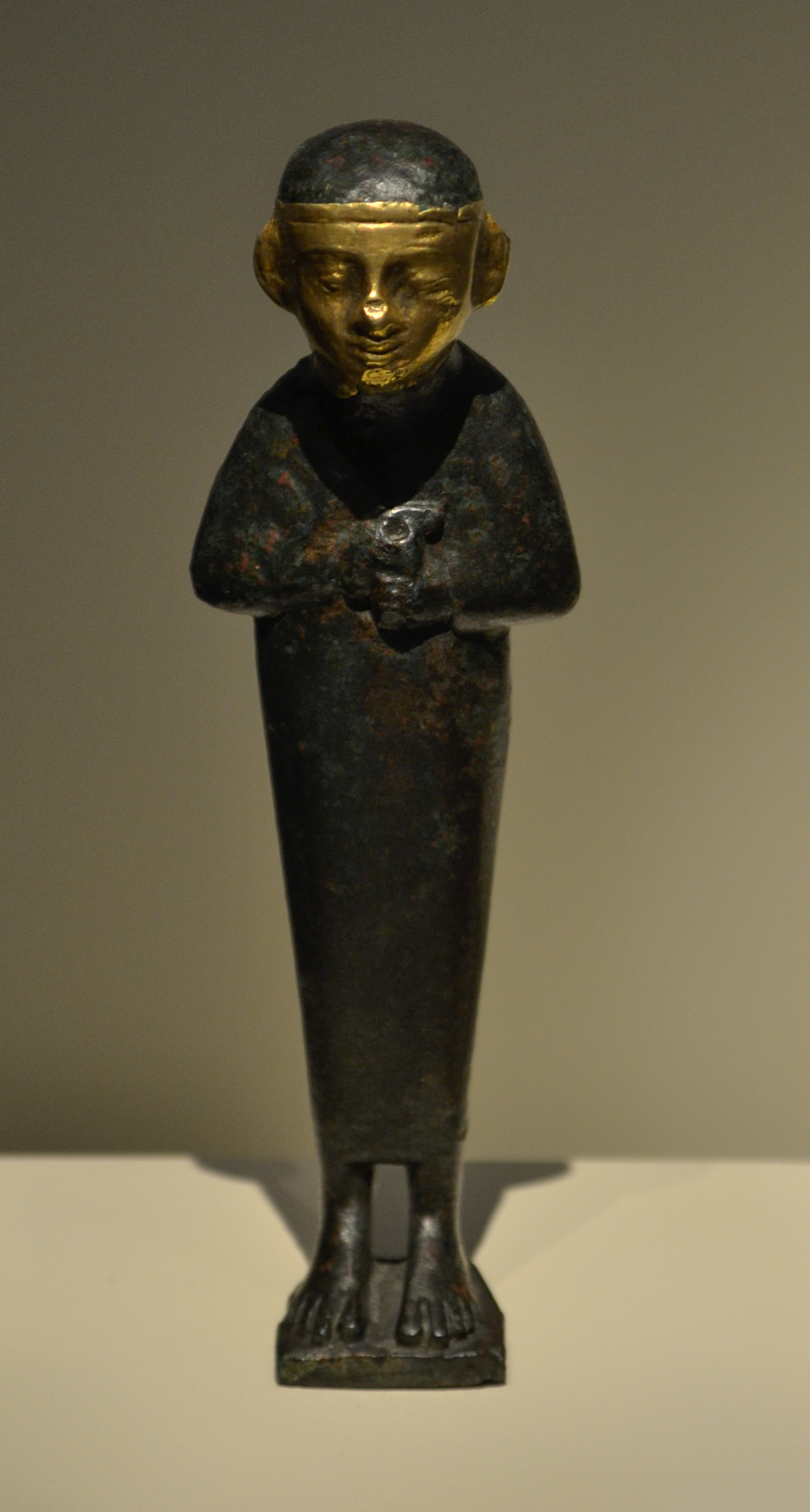
- Material: Bronze
- Height: 12.9 cm
- Width: 1.8 cm
- Created: c. 750 BC
- Discovered: 1928; Cádiz, Andalusia, Spain
- Present location: Madrid, Community of Madrid, Spain

The Priest of Cadiz is a gold and bronze figure, 12.9 centimetres (5.1 in) high, that dates from the 8th century BC. It is on display in the National Archaeological Museum of Spain in Madrid.

== Discovery ==
The figure was found in 1928, during the foundation work of the Telefónica building in Cádiz. The workers delivered it to the architect Francisco Hernández Rubio. Later it was integrated into Madrid's National Archaeological Museum collection.

== Interpretations ==
It has been proposed that the figure represents the Egyptian god Ptah. According to recent studies, it is believed to represent a priest of the temple of Melqart. The figure is identified as a divinity due to its posture and clothes, the attributes held in its hands and the gold band across its face.

The composition of its bronze, incorporating arsenic and zinc, suggests the figure was imported, possibly from Phoenicia.

== Bibliography ==
- Javier Jiménez Ávila: La toréutica orientalizante en la Península Ibérica , Madrid, 2002, ISBN 978-84-95983-05-3
- Asunción Martín: Sacerdote de Cádiz, M.A.N., 2008, NIPO 551-09-006-X
