= Mobile marketing research =

Mobile marketing research is a method of data collection using the functions of mobile devices, like mobile phones, smartphones, and PDAs. With increasing members of the public having access to personal mobile devices in the 21st century, mobile marketing research developed as a way to utilize mobile communication for research purposes.

== Background ==
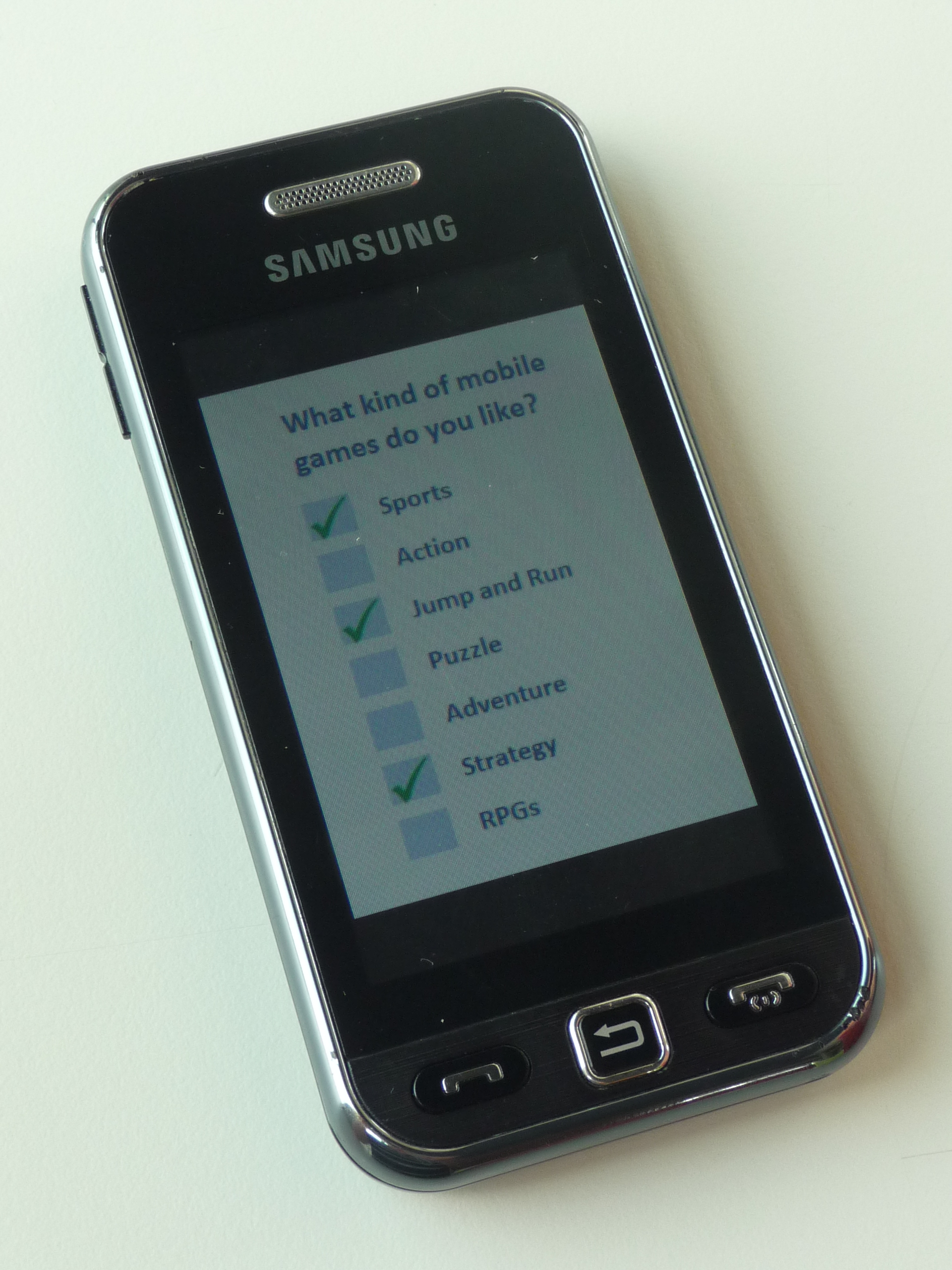
Survey on a mobile phone

Due to trends towards digitization at the turn of the 21st century, the marketing research industry found increasing difficulty reaching respondents via traditional media, making it harder for marketing researchers to make assumptions about their behavior. Researchers adapted their approaches alongside these changes.

== Definition and development ==
In the 21st century, mobile device use is common in most countries. Researchers noticed this trend in the early 2000s and began adapting their marketing research approach, responding to predictions that mobile devices will become the most often used instrument to connect to the internet by the year 2020.

A Pew Research’s Internet & American Life study in January 2014, 58% of adults in the US had a smartphone, up from 56% in May 2013. In other parts of the world, like Central and Latin America, many people never had a PC, but they now have a smartphone. For instance, in Chile, more than 85% of the participants of an online panel had a smartphone in 2014, whereas only around 60% had a desktop.

Some marketing methods include conducting surveys via mobile phones, in part to reach a younger audience. Although, generally, researchers found that the proportion which prefers to answer through smartphones is significant across many countries.

== Mobile survey methods ==
=== Methodology ===
According to Maxl, four different kinds of methods are distinguished which can be used as required. These are listed in the following figure.

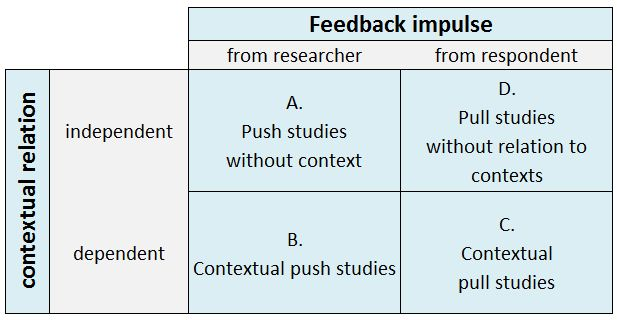
Introduction: Mobile market research methods

Push studies without contexts (A) are conducted independently from time and location. This can be CATI- or CACI studies as well as surveys by SMS or MMS. In cases of these research methods, the feedback impulse actively comes from the researcher. With pertinent. push studies (B) the researcher prompts the respondent to give appropriate feedback once it is recognized that he/she is located in a particular environment or is in a certain situation. Pull studies are characterized that participants call in the questionnaire themselves. In many cases, short notes draw attention to a survey or an evaluation. Such communications may be placed in certain contexts (C) (e.g. on receipts, advertisements, or product packaging) to encourage participation. Non-context-sensitive pull studies (D) are not relevant for marketing research since they provide only general feedback, which has no relation to a fixed object of research. Therefore, they are hardly controlled and evaluated.

=== Data collection on a technical view ===
On the technical level, there are three different possibilities of data collection. The Short Message Service (SMS) outlines one possibility, which can be used as a basis to conduct interviews. This is very suitable for ad hoc surveys if particular key questions have to be answered. For Java applications, the participants receive a link to a WAP page where an application is to be downloaded. The survey software is immediately installed on the mobile phone and the survey can be filled out straight away.

Furthermore, surveys can be accessed via the mobile internet. The webpage is also called in via WAP push. Questionnaires are created and designed in different formats. This allows disruption to complete the questionnaire to further process on a different technical device with internet access.

== Disadvantages and difficulties of mobile market research ==
A concern about mobile marketing research is the representation sampling. Members of the population who don’t own a mobile phone are not part of sampling. Mobile phone users have to be able to be reached as well as to be willing to take part in the survey. Equally important is to also know the number of people who use the SMS service and how many of these people own a web-enabled phone. Only if all these aspects are noticed, a conclusion regarding the sampling can be drawn. For these reasons, mobile surveys alone does not meet standards of statistical representability.

Data acquisition through mobile phones holds more difficulties. On the one hand, there are high costs for incentives and intensive recruitment by the institutes. On the other hand, the participants of the survey have to pay the costs for internet usage via mobile phone. However, more and more respondents do not pay the internet access based on the time spent on the Internet and more and more places propose free Wi-Fi, making this issue less and less relevant for respondents. Additionally, there are also technical difficulties that may occur. The high number of different and not-compatible software or the low transmission rate of data are just a few to name. To improve the respondents' experience in answering web surveys on mobile devices, optimizing the layout of the survey for smaller screens is crucial: non-optimized layouts lead to lower data quality. Restrictions concerning the reveal and passing on of mobile phone numbers (because of data protection and the lack of Anonymity) are setting limits to the research in this field of study, too.

== Advantages and possibilities of mobile market research ==
Statistical methods in mobile market research profit from the fact that they do not depend on place or time. This means that surveys via mobile phone can be done anywhere and at any time and are therefore much more advantageous compared to surveys via landline phones. Considering that a high number of participants of the main target groups cannot be reached at home at most hours of the day, the chance to get hold of them by mobile phone is much higher. Especially concerning to people under the age of 25 as well as business people, who are often on the way and cannot get hold of easily, the chances of the mobile market research are promising. As most people always carry their mobile phones with them, an immediate transmission of personal impressions of current events is possible at any time. Thus, the so-called ‘magic moment’ can be captured, which is often very helpful. Surveys concerning product placement and efficiency of sales promotion measures at the point of sale turned out to be perfectly realizable this way. Looking at the topic “Access possibilities to WAP-Surveys” by mobile phone, as well as at the topic “Getting hold of potential participants”, there are some developments that should be named. The trend towards the increasing distribution of web-enabled mobile phones, and the improved representativity that comes along with it, does continue from 2007 to 2008, Nielsen Mobile noticed an increase in mobile internet usage. With decreasing costs and improving technology, a further upward tendency can be expected. In addition, mobile internet usage increases with the rapidly developing distribution of smartphones. According to IM (Mediawork Initiative), already in 2013 more people will log in with their smartphones, than with a PC. Mobile statistics show a high and very fast response rate. As a result of the independence from time and place, answers can be submitted immediately. This also means that results can almost be transmitted in real-time. A study from Globalpark shows that approximately 35% of the participants answered a mobile survey within 2 hours. Through the novelty of the form of the survey and its playful design, mobile research has a motivating effect on the participants. This applies especially to young, technologically interested male persons. iPhone users are also considered to be very communicative. As the devices are easy to handle, the users are more likely and more motivated to take part in surveys. A study examining how to best reach mobile respondents published in the Journal of Social Science Computer Review underlines the importance of social factors. Especially their subjective belief of how they are seen by significant others, or their intention of how they would like to be seen by significant others seem to play a major role in their mobile phone behavior.
