= Ethnographic questionnaire =

Collection of open-ended, descriptive questions

An ethnographic questionnaire is a collection of open-ended, descriptive questions within an ethnographic study, used to elicit detailed, personal accounts of a participant's experiences, perspectives, and cultural context, often as part of broader ethnographic methods like participant observation and interviews.

== History ==
One of the first questionnaires, regarded as an early ethnographic questionnaire, is the “Instructions [for] antiquarians and historians of the Kingdom”, commissioned by the King of Sweden in 1630.

In 1577 and 1584, Juan de Ovando y Godoy, a churchman and lawyer working for the Council of the Indies, prepared a set of questions "to be sent to officials in Mexico and Peru". It was later developed by Juan Lopez de Velasco, the Principal Royal Chronicler-Geographer, into Relaciones Geográficas, which contained questions about "the geography, mineralogy, natural history, languages, government structures, traditions, customs and religious practices of the Spanish Indies". It was issued as an official document of the state, and contained 50 sections. Examples of questions included: “state in general the climate and quality of the said province or district; whether it is cold or hot, dry or damp” (no. 2); “state to whom the Indians belonged in heathen times … and the form of worship, rites and customs they had, good and bad” (no. 14); “Mention any other notable things about the natural features, and any effects of soil, air, sky, which may be found in any part and which are worthy of being noted” (no. 50). Its preface contained instructions, such as: "The answers are to be short and clear. That which is certain shall be stated as such, and that which is not shall be declared doubtful, in such a way that the reports shall be valid, and in conformance with the following queries."

The theologian and Orientalist Johann David Michaelis prepared a questionnaire for the Danish Arabia Expedition of 1761–1767; the questions asked for "empirical evidence for natural explanations of Old Testament stories".

Thomas Jefferson probably wrote a questionnaire for the Lewis and Clark Expedition (1803–1806), titled "Inquiries relative to the Indians of Louisiana".

The French philosopher Joseph-Marie Degérando composed a questionnaire for expeditions of Captain Nicolas Baudin's to New Holland (1800–1803) and François Levaillant's to Africa (1800).

== In the Russian Empire ==
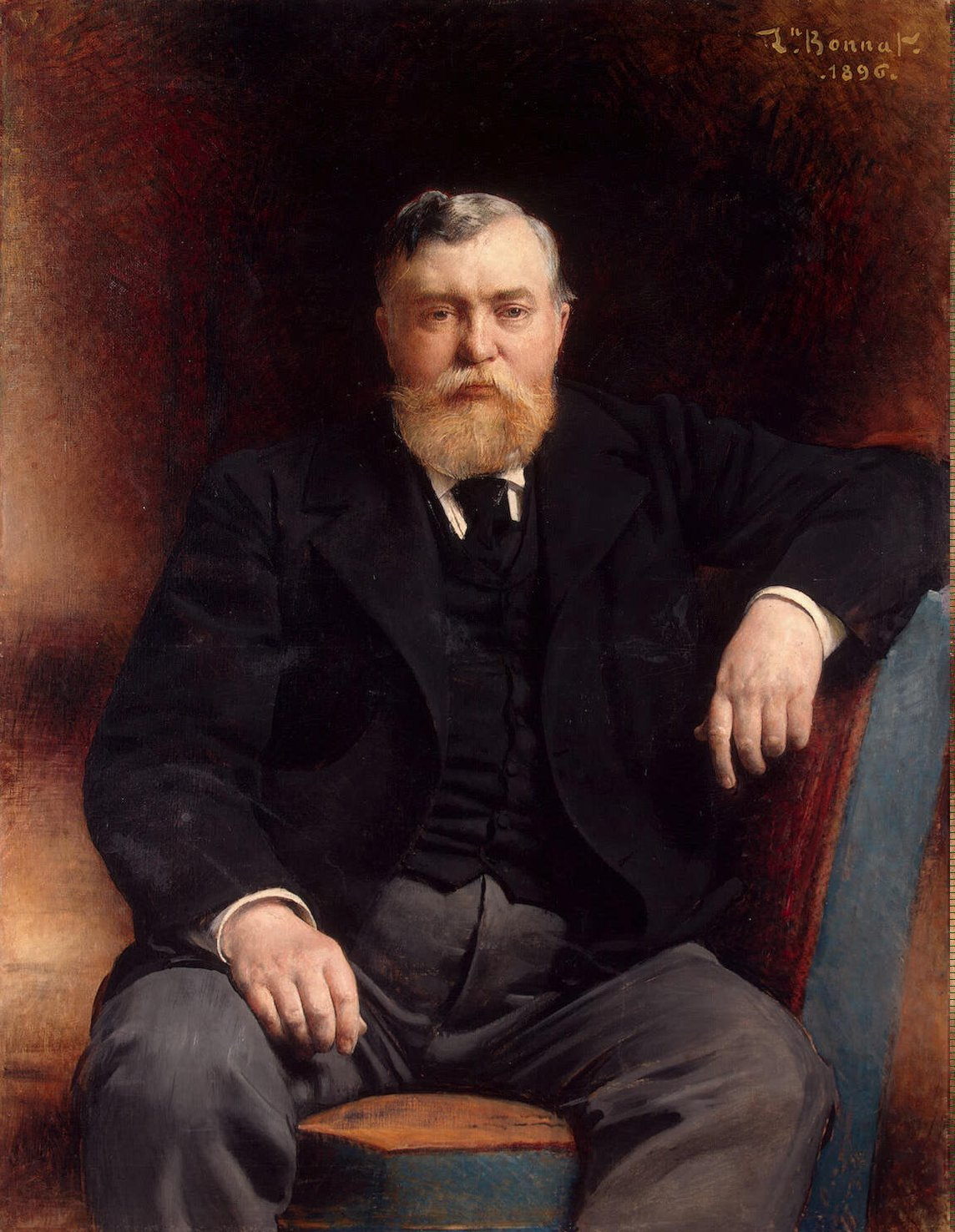
Viacheslav Tenishev

In 1848, Nikolai Nadezhdin created a program focused on Russian peasants, and in 1896 Viacheslav Tenishev created his Program of Ethnographic Information about the Peasants of Central Russia, that consisted of around 2,500 questions. (Note: Per Deutsch 2011, pp. 62–63: "the first version of the program officially listed 491 questions, the actual total was closer to 2,500, since almost all of the numbered questions had multiple parts or separate sub-questions") Another example is Olga Semyonova Tian-Shanskaiai's ethnographic study which also used a questionnaire, made during four years in several local villages around her family's estate. The results of the study were published in 1914, after Semyonova's death, titled The Life of "Ivan": Sketches of Peasant Life from One of the Black Earth Provinces.

== Jewish questionnaires ==
Folklorist Friedrich S. Krauss created the first survey (on "secret languages") in 1890s, which he published and urged people to send their example to him. Rabbi Max Grunwald composed the first questionnare focused on Jewish folklore (Fragebogen) in 1896. It had no questions but was an "outline for collectors" on two pages and 34 sections like 'onomastics and dialect', 'literature', 'belief and legend', 'tradition and custom', 'augury, magic and folk-medicine', 'house-building and folk-costume'. Immanuel Olswanger created a similar questionnaire in 1917, which was published by the Swiss Folklore Society. In the Russian Empire, Hebrew writers from Odessa Alter Druyanov, Haim Nahman Bialik and Yehushua Hanna Ravnitski created a questionnaire in 1914, similar to Grunwald's "in its emphasis on genres and its lack of question-marks". After the October Revolution and World War I, YIVO created a similar questionnaire in Yiddish. Hungarian folklorist Bernhard Heller published his questionnaire in 1930, with questions related not to folklore, but "to the house's furniture, jewelry, clothes, crafts". Historian Dani Schrire argues that questionnaires "prescribe the knowledge they seek to document", and that different questionnaires "constructed different 'lores' and different 'folks'".

S. An-sky's "Dos Yidishe Etnografishe Program", published in 1914. The title and the author's name are in Russian, even though the whole text is in Yiddish.

The Yiddish writer S. An-sky organized the first Jewish Ethnographic Expedition to the Pale of Settlement in the Russian Empire in 1913-1914. Interrupted by First World War, expedition visited around 60 Jewish shtetls on the territory of modern Ukraine. Avrom Yuditsky, one of the students who helped An-sky to gather questions, was asked to create a special questionnaire, titled "Hasidim". It wasn't used during the expedition, and now can be found in Vernadsky Library in Kiev. Another questionnaire, "Local Historical Program", was distributed during the expedition. It contained questions not only about Jewish life cycle, but also about important historical events and figures like Sabbatai Zevi and Jacob Frank, 1648 Khmelnytsky pogroms, 1812 war with Napoleon, blood libels, pogroms, emigration to America and others.

Initially, An-sky wanted to create a program of 10,000 questions, but soon decided that it was "impractical", and decided to divide it into two parts. Only the first one was finished. An-sky wrote the program in 1914, after the expedition, with the help of ethnographer Lev Shternberg, though his involvement is questionable. The program was written in Yiddish and titled "Dos Yidishe Etnografishe Program" ("The Jewish Ethnographic Program"). The first volume, titled "Der Mentsch" ("The Person"), was published in St. Petersburg in 1914, but was not distributed because of the war. The second volume, "Shabbes un Yontif" ("The Sabbath and Holidays") was not finished. The first volume has 2,087 questions that cover traditional Jewish life cycle from birth to death, divided into five parts: the Child, from the Kheyder to the Wedding, the Wedding, Family Life, and Death. Unlike the smaller "Local Historical Program", "Der Mentsch" has no questions about contemporary themes like political parties and labor activism, or emigration to America.

Some questions from An-sky's questionnaire:

5. The Angel of Death, the Dumah [Guardian Angel of the Dead], the Soul after Death, Gilgul, Dybbuk

- 1967. How do people picture the Angel of Death? His appearance, his characteristics?
- 1968. What weapons or instruments does the Angel of Death employ: a sword or poison or both together?
- 1974. Is it possible to fool the Angel of Death? What stories do you know about such cases? Do people think that you can fool the Angel of Death by changing your name?
- 2006. What does the Khibit-ha-keyver [beating after death] consist of? Which Angels of Destruction [Malakhe-Khabole] punish the dead man? How long does the beating last?

The program was never distributed because of World War I. In the 1920s, the YIVO institute in Vilna used parts of the program and collected answers for the questions from the "Death" chapter. Historian David G. Roskies wrote that An-sky "turned the fieldworker's questionnaire into a modern epic". Historian James Loeffler called it "a manual for the composition of a new 'oral Torah'". Nathaniel Deutsch translated and annotated the questionnaire to English. He calls it "one of the most illuminating, idiosyncratic, and, until now, unplumbed portraits of this complex reality that anyone has ever created".

Deutsch's translation was published as The Jewish Dark Continent in 2011. Deutsch writes that he consulted with Hasidim in New York, with elderly Jews who emigrated to the US from the shtetls visited by An-sky, and with professional Yiddishists. He called the translation and annotation process a "reverse-engineering" of the program's composition.

Uriel Weinreich and Marvin Herzog founded the Language and Culture Archive of Ashkenazic Jewry (LCAAJ) at Columbia University in New York; they also employed a "questionnaire of more than two hundred pages" and gathered hundreds of hours of interviews in Yiddish. Vilnius Research Institute interviewed "hundreds of individuals" in 2002–2009, that are now in the Archives of Historical and Ethnographic Yiddish Memories. In 2022, Mauas and Rotman published an "Updated Ethnographic Questionnaire on Israeli Time"; according to the authors, it "expands or updates" An-sky's questionnaire. It contains questions about emergency and Shabbat sirens in Israel.

== Downfall ==
In the early 20th century, there was a "spectacular downfall of ethnographic questionnaires", as scientific consensus drifted towards the view that predetermined set of questions frame the received answers. This idea was described as being "central to Bronislaw Malinowski's push for professional anthropological fieldwork". According to Malinowski, "amateur observers ... could not adapt pre-prepared questions to local contexts because they did not have the means to think beyond the “preconceptions” built into such questions". Xxx writes that "The rejection of questionnaires thus became central to anthropology's self-understanding."

The problem [that defines modern anthropology] is not simply to find answers to questions the ethnographer brings into the field, but also to find the questions that go with the responses he observes after his arrival.

— Charles O. Frake, 1964

== Sources ==
- Deutsch, Nathaniel (2011). The Jewish Dark Continent: Life and Death in the Russian Pale of Settlement. Cambridge, Mass: Harvard University Press. ISBN 978-0-674-04728-0.
