= Marketing research process =

The marketing research process is a six-step process involving the definition of the problem being studied upon, determining what approach to take, formulation of research design, field work entailed, data preparation and analysis, and the generation of reports, how to present these reports, and overall, how the task can be accomplished.

== Steps in the marketing research process ==
The first stage in a marketing research project is to define the problem. In defining the problem, the researcher should take into account the purpose of the study, relevant background information and all necessary data, and how the information gathered will be used in decision making. Problem definition involves discussion with the decision makers, interviews with industry experts, analysis of secondary data, and, perhaps, some qualitative research, such as focus groups. Once the problem has been precisely defined, the research can be designed and conducted properly.

Development of an approach to the problem is the second step. This includes formulating an objective or theoretical framework, constructing analytical models, generating research questions, hypotheses, and identifying characteristics or factors that can influence the research design. This process is guided by discussions with management and industry experts, case studies and simulations, analysis of secondary data, qualitative research and pragmatic considerations.

The third step involves the formulation of the research design which is the framework or blueprint for conducting the marketing research project. It details the procedures necessary in obtaining the required information, and its purpose is to design a study that will test the hypotheses of interest, determine possible answers to the research questions, and provide the information necessary for decision making. Conducting exploratory research, precisely defining the variables, and designing appropriate scales to measure them are also components of the research design. The issue on how the data should be obtained from the respondents must be addressed. It is also necessary to design a questionnaire and a sampling plan to select respondents for the study.

The formulation of a research design serves as the central blueprint for the project, detailing the specific procedures necessary to obtain required information and test hypotheses. This stage begins with a comprehensive analysis of secondary data and qualitative research to refine the study's scope. It further involves defining the exact information required and establishing measurement and scaling procedures. The researcher then determines the methods for quantitative data collection such as surveys, structured observations, or experiments which necessitates the technical design of questionnaires and the selection of an appropriate sampling process and size. Finally, a formal plan for data analysis is established to ensure the gathered information can be effectively transformed into actionable management insights.

Fourth is data collection which involves manpower/staff members who operate either in the field, as in the case of personal interviewing (in-home, mall intercept, or computer-assisted personal interviewing), from an office by telephone (telephone or computer-assisted telephone interviewing), or through mail (traditional mail and mail panel surveys with pre-recruited households). Proper selection, training, supervision, and evaluation of staff members helps minimize data-collection errors.

Data preparation and analysis is the fifth step and includes the editing, coding, transcription, and verification of data. Each questionnaire or observation form is inspected, or edited, and, if necessary, corrected. Number or letter codes are assigned to represent each response to each question in the questionnaire. The data from the questionnaires are transcribed or key-punched on to magnetic tapes, or disks or inputted directly into the computer. Verification ensures that the data from the original questionnaires have been accurately transcribed.

Analyzed data gives meaning to the information that have been collected. Univariate techniques are used for analyzing data when there is a single measurement of each element or unit in the sample, or, if there are several measurements of each element, each RCH variable is analyzed in isolation. On the other hand, multivariate techniques are used for analyzing data when there are two or more measurements on each element and the variables are analyzed simultaneously.

The last stage is the report preparation and presentation. The entire project should be documented in a written report and the results and major findings must be presented. The findings must be in a comprehensible format so that they can be readily used in the decision making process. In addition, an oral presentation should be made to management using tables, figures, and graphs to enhance clarity and impact.

For these reasons, interviews with experts are more useful in conducting marketing research for industrial firms and for products of a technical nature, where it is relatively easy to identify and approach the experts. This method is also helpful in situations where little information is available from other sources, as in the case of radically new products.

== Primary data vs. secondary data ==
Primary data is sourced by the researcher for the specific purpose of addressing the research problem. On the other hand, secondary data is collected for some purpose other than the problem at hand. This data includes information made available by business and government sources, commercial marketing research firms, and computerized databases. Secondary data is an economical and quick source of background information.

== Qualitative research ==
Information, industry experts, and secondary data may not be sufficient to define the research problem. Sometimes qualitative research must be undertaken to gain a qualitative understanding of the problem and its underlying factors. Qualitative research is unstructured, exploratory in nature, based on small samples, and may utilize popular qualitative techniques such as focus groups (group interviews), word association (asking respondents to indicate their first responses to stimulus words), and depth interviews (one-on-one interviews which probe the respondents' thoughts in detail). Other exploratory research techniques, such as pilot surveys with small samples of respondents, may also be undertaken.

== See also ==
- Research strategies of election campaign communication research
- Mobile marketing research
