= DIY research =

DIY Research (DIY Market Research) means marketing, customer or personnel research using online research methods that any individual or organization, whether they be a professional researcher or not, carries out via special online research software, or online survey tool. These survey software products allow users to connect and perform one-on-one online interviews, create online questionnaires, distribute them to an email list or internet access panels, and analyze the data in real time without outsourcing to a specialised research agency or data processing company.

== DIY Quantitative Research ==
Quantitative research is a structured approach to gathering and evaluating data from different sources using different statistical tools. DIY quantitative research tools provide resources to individuals to identify sample needs based on specific criteria for their research study. Historically, quantitative research studies required several resources – a sampling provider that manages a panel of individuals that match the demographic and psychographic needs of the researchers, tools for creating and implementing surveys, and tools for analyzing the results of such a survey.

DIY quantitative research systems are frequently software as a service (SaaS), allowing for all participants in the market research process to collaborate in a single interface, while integrating with outside survey authoring and analytics tools.
