= Behavior coding =

Research method

Behavior coding, or behavioral coding, is a research method for evaluating questionnaire design and survey interviewer performance and interaction.

Behavior coding has three main uses:

1. Pretesting to assess respondent cognitive processing of survey questions
2. Detection of problematic survey interviewer behaviors
3. Interaction analysis to study how interviewer and respondent interact

Standardized codes are assigned to overt interviewer and/or respondent behaviors during the question and answer sequence in the survey interview, such as when the respondent asks for clarifications. The coding scheme is developed based on the research objective, but usually includes data collection-related variables such as question wording and interviewer styles. The coding is done using audio recordings of the interview, written transcripts of audio recordings, or via automated text analysis. Live interview coding is less practiced.
