= Custom online panel =

Group of survey respondents

A custom online panel or Internet access panel is a group of pre-screened respondents who have expressed a willingness to participate in surveys and/or customer feedback sessions. The custom online panel is also known as a customer advisory panel, proprietary panel or an online research panel. Respondents become "panelists" by completing a profiling questionnaire. The data collected includes demographics, lifestyle characteristics and media habits, which provides a basis for future survey participation.

== Form and process ==
A panel can range in size from 100 to 100,000 or more people. Larger panels can enable surveys of smaller target groups. Panel quality is not determined solely by size, however, and how panel members have been sourced is also important.

Panels can provide a dedicated group that market researchers can engage with and learn from over time. At a moment’s notice researchers can investigate the attitudes, behaviour and opinions of existing or potential customers using interactive surveys, discussion forums and 3D retail environments. Plus, results are available instantly and responses can be tracked over time.

Panels are a growing phenomenon in the market research industry. They bridge the gap between a population that is reluctant to cooperate with telephone surveys and the organizations that need to know their perceptions and attitudes more than ever before.

A specialized form of online panels typically known, as expert networks are used by investment funds and consulting firms to collect information as well.
