= NIPO =

Coordinates: 52°20′39″N 4°54′42″E

- Type: Subsidiary
- Industry: Survey data collection Market Research
- Founded: 1979
- Headquarters: Amsteldijk 166; 1079 LH, Amsterdam, Netherlands
- Area served: Worldwide
- Key people: Jeroen Noordman (Managing Director), Ard Bisschop (Account Director), Filip de Bruin (Product Director)
- Products: Nfield (cloud), NFS (on-premise)
- Website: nipo.com

NIPO, previously named NIPO Software, is a long-term provider to the professional market research industry for Online, CAPI, and CATI surveys. NIPO is a worldwide Market Research software provider. The company is headquartered in Amsterdam, Netherlands and has branches in Spain, Portugal and India.

NIPO's primary offering is centered around the Nfield platform, hosted in a SaaS model on Microsoft Azure cloud servers. The Nfield suite covers all aspects of market research, including questionnaire design, data collection, tabulations, fieldwork management and reporting.

== History ==
Arnoud van Zanten founded NIPO Software in the 1970s as a department of NIPO, the market research institute, now Kantar Netherlands. The NIPO name originally stood for Netherlands Institute of Public Opinion, which was established by Wim de Jonge and Jan Stapel in September 1945.

In 1986, NIPO (Software) became an independent company from the research institute to cater to both internal and external customers. In 1999, NIPO was purchased by Taylor Nelson Sofres, now called Kantar TNS.
