= Brand strength analysis =

Brand strength analysis describes efforts to determine the strength a brand has compared with its competitors.

== Software companies ==
Software brand strength is hard to measure accurately. Techniques from competitor analysis can be used to compare companies over time. Crowley and Zajas have analyzed how to determine the benefits of strong brand names in the software sector. Quantitative marketing research by sampling large customer bases using adaptive conjoint techniques and qualitative marketing research by focus groups and observing customers in stores are examples of techniques they recommend.

Benefits to a company of good brand recognition include speeding up new product acceptance, enabling market share penetration by advertising, and resisting price erosion. During the decision process for software buying, usually 95% of customers buy a brand that they were previously aware of, 90% buy a brand that they considered beforehand, and 80% buy the specific brand they expected to. According to Crowley and Zajas, branding power measurement is an important way that companies can keep track of their position in the software market.

== See also ==
- Brand
- Brand loyalty
- Brand management
- Brand valuation
