= Opinion =

Judgement, viewpoint, or statement that is not conclusive

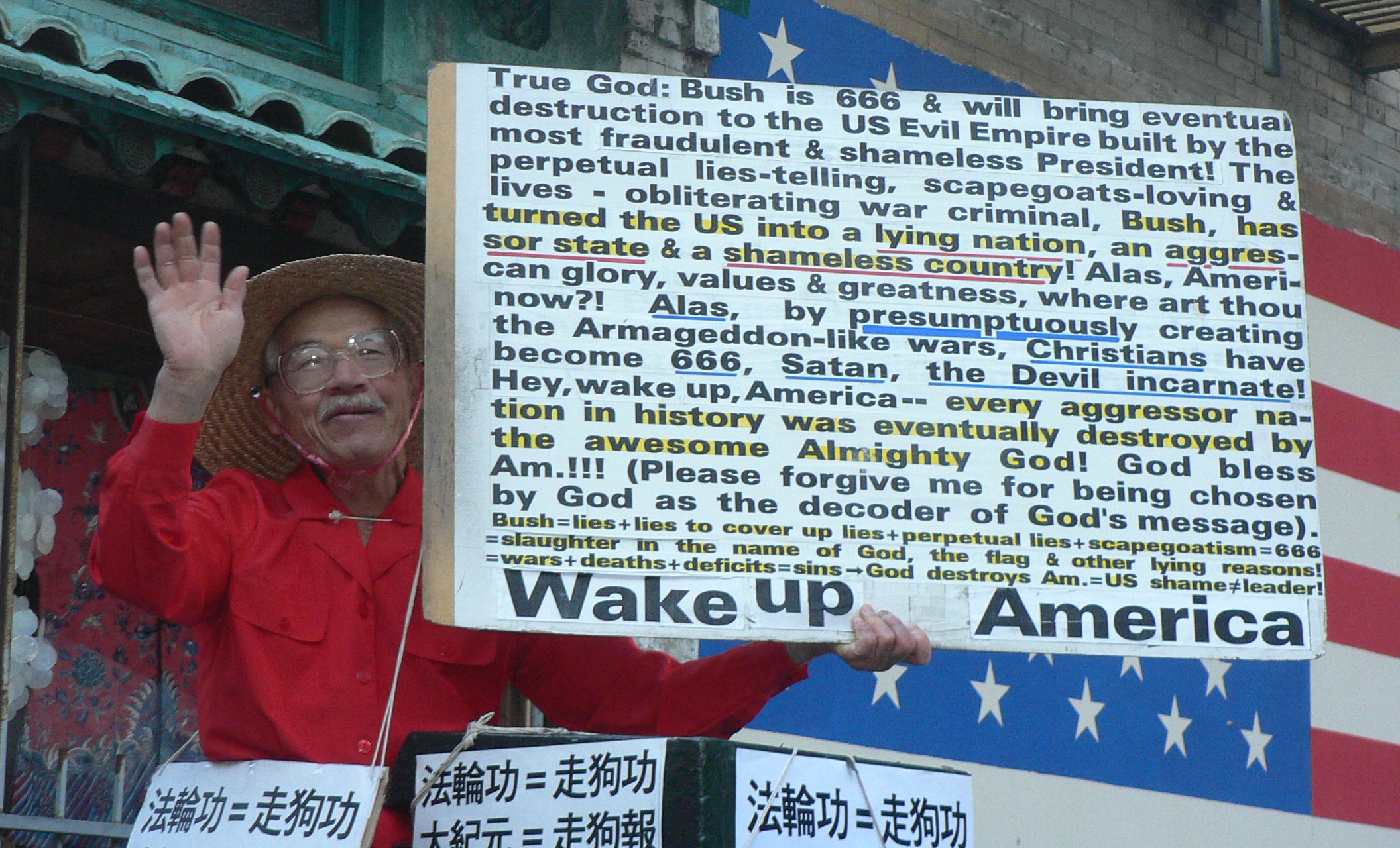
"Soapboxing" in Chinatown, San Francisco

An opinion is a judgement, viewpoint, or statement that is not conclusive, as opposed to facts, which are true statements.

== Definition ==
A given opinion may deal with subjective matters in which there is no conclusive finding, or it may deal with facts which are sought to be disputed by the logical fallacy that one is entitled to their opinions.

Distinguishing fact from opinion is that facts are verifiable, i.e. can be agreed to by the consensus of experts. An example is: "United States of America was involved in the Vietnam War," versus "United States of America was right to get involved in the Vietnam War". An opinion may be supported by facts and principles, in which case it becomes an argument.

Different people may draw opposing conclusions (opinions) even if they agree on the same set of facts. Opinions rarely change without new arguments being presented. It can be reasoned that one opinion is better supported by the facts than another, by analyzing the supporting arguments.

In casual use, the term opinion may be the result of a person's perspective, understanding, particular feelings, beliefs, and desires.

Though not hard fact, collective opinions or professional opinions are defined as meeting a higher standard to substantiate the opinion.

== Collective and professional opinions ==
=== Public opinion ===
In contemporary usage, public opinion is the aggregate of individual attitudes or beliefs held by a population (e.g., a city, state, or country), while consumer opinion is the similar aggregate collected as part of marketing research (e.g., opinions of users of a particular product or service). Typically, because the process of gathering opinions from all individuals is difficult, expensive, or impossible to obtain, public opinion (or consumer opinion) is estimated using survey sampling (e.g., with a representative sample of a population).

=== Group opinion ===
In some social sciences, especially political science and psychology, group opinion refers to the aggregation of opinions collected from a group of subjects, such as members of a jury, legislature, committee, or other collective decision-making body. In these situations, researchers are often interested in questions related to social choice, conformity, and group polarization.

=== Scientific opinion ===
"Scientific opinion" may reflect opinions on scientific concerns as articulated by one or more scientists, published in scholarly journals or respected textbooks, both of which entail peer-review and rigorous professional editing. It may also refer to opinions published by professional, academic, or governmental organizations about scientific findings and their possible implications.

A related—but not identical—term, scientific consensus, is the prevailing view on a scientific topic within the scientific community, such as the scientific opinion on climate change.

Scientific opinion(s) can be "partial, temporally contingent, conflicting, and uncertain" so that there may be no accepted consensus for a particular situation. In other circumstances, a particular scientific opinion may be at odds with consensus.

Scientific literacy, also called public understanding of science, is an educational goal concerned with providing the public with the necessary tools to benefit from scientific opinion.

=== Legal opinion ===
A "legal opinion" or "closing opinion" is a type of professional opinion, usually contained in a formal legal-opinion letter, given by an attorney to a client or a third party. Most legal opinions are given in connection with business transactions. The opinion expresses the attorney's professional judgement regarding the legal aspect of the transaction. The opinion can be "clean" or "reasoned". A legal opinion is not a guarantee that a court will reach any particular result. However, a mistaken or incomplete legal opinion may be grounds for a professional malpractice claim against the attorney, pursuant to which the attorney may be required to pay the claimant damages incurred as a result of relying on the faulty opinion.

=== Judicial opinion ===
A "judicial opinion" or "opinion of the court" is an opinion of a judge or group of judges that accompanies and explains an order or ruling in a controversy before the court. A judicial opinion generally lays out the facts that the court recognized as being established, the legal principles the court is bound by, and the application of the relevant principles to the recognized facts. The goal is to demonstrate the rationale the court used in reaching its decision.

=== Reasoned opinion ===
As the second step of the European Union's infringement procedure, the European Commission issues a "reasoned opinion" when it is concerned that a Member State has not implemented a Directive or other EU law. The reasoned opinion, provided for under Article 258 of the Treaty on the Functioning of the European Union, constitutes a formal request to the state concerned for implementing action to be taken, usually within a two month deadline.

Also under EU law, a "reasoned opinion" may be issued by a Member State in relation to proposed EU legislation, if the Member State is concerned that the proposal infringes the EU's subsidiarity principle. Article 6, Protocol 2 to the Treaty of Lisbon (2007, entered into force on 1 December 2009) allows Member States to issue a reasoned opinion within 8 weeks of their official notification of the draft legislation. As from 2019-20 the European Commission has allowed a longer period for reasoned opinions to be issued over the Christmas and New Year period.

=== Expert report ===
An expert report is a study written by one or more authorities that states findings and offers opinions.

In law, expert reports are generated by expert witnesses offering their opinions on points of controversy in a legal case and are typically sponsored by one side or the other in a litigation in order to support that party's claims. The reports state facts, discuss details, explain reasoning, and justify the experts' conclusions and opinions.

In medicine, an expert report is a critical assessment of a medical topic, for example, an independent assessment of the cost–benefit ratio of a particular medical treatment.

As part of survey pretesting, an expert report (using the expert review method) identifies potential problems that could affect data quality and data collection by evaluating survey questionnaires and survey translations.

== See also ==
- Diṭṭhigata upādāna – Attachment to views in Buddhism
- Doxa
- Epistemic virtue
- Epistemology
- I'm entitled to my opinion
- Justified true belief
- Opinion journalism
- Opinion poll
- Point of view (philosophy)
- Scientific evidence
- Soapbox
- Speaker's Corner
- Truthiness
