= Jewish life cycle =

The Jewish life cycle is marked by a series of religious and cultural rituals that celebrate significant milestones from birth to death. Each event has deep religious meaning, community involvement, and traditional practices that have been passed down through generations.

== Birth and childhood ==
The life cycle begins with the birth of a child, celebrated by various ceremonies. For boys, the Brit Milah (circumcision) is performed on the eighth day after birth, followed by a celebratory meal. The birth of a child is a joyous occasion, and the community often comes together to support the new parents.

== Education ==
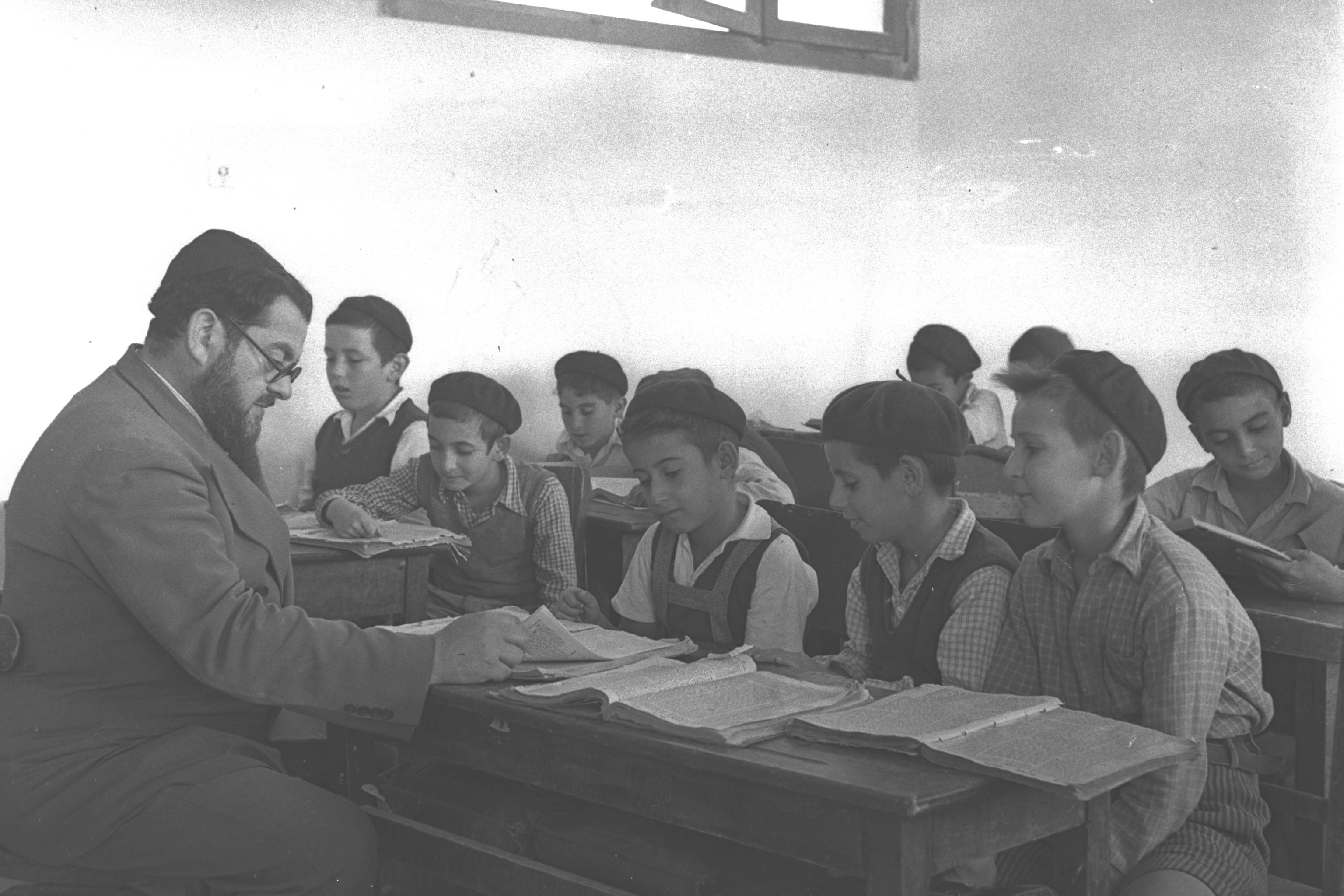
Cheder in Tel Aviv, 1946

Education is a fundamental aspect of Jewish life, starting from a young age. Children begin their religious education early, often attending cheder or Talmud Torah to learn Jewish traditions, the Hebrew language, and the Torah. The Bar Mitzvah for boys at age 13, and the Bat Mitzvah for girls at age 12 or 13, marks the transition into religious adulthood. This involves reciting from the Torah in front of the congregation and signifies the young person's responsibilities in the Jewish community.

== Marriage ==
Marriage is celebrated with a wedding ceremony known as a Chuppah. The couple stands under a canopy, symbolizing the home they will build together. The ceremony includes the exchange of vows, the giving of a ring, and the reading of the Ketubah (marriage contract). The wedding concludes with the breaking of a glass, symbolizing the destruction of the Temple in Jerusalem and the couple's commitment to rebuild and protect their relationship.

== Death and mourning ==
The end of the life cycle is marked by funeral and mourning practices. Upon death, the body is ritually washed and dressed in simple white shrouds (Tachrichim). The funeral service usually takes place as soon as possible after death, often within 24 hours. After the burial, the family enters a period of mourning called Shiva, which lasts for seven days. During Shiva, mourners receive visitors and recite prayers, including the Kaddish, a prayer for the deceased. Mourning continues with the Shloshim, a 30-day period, and for close relatives, the mourning can last up to a year.

== Bibliography ==
- "Life Cycle". yivoencyclopedia.org. YIVO.
- Marcus, Ivan G. (2004). The Jewish life cycle: rites of passage from biblical to modern times. Seattle: University of Washington Press. ISBN 978-0295984414.
- Rabbi Peter Knobel, ed. (2018). Navigating the journey: the essential guide to the Jewish life cycle. New York, NY: Central Conference of American Rabbis, CCAR Press. ISBN 978-0-88123-293-6.
- Sperber, Daniel; Levin, Edward (2008). The Jewish life cycle: custom, lore and iconography Jewish customs from the cradle to the grave. Ramat-Gan New York: Bar-Ilan university press Oxford university press. ISBN 978-965-226-334-6.
