= Computer-assisted telephone interviewing =

Telephone surveying technique that includes assistance by a software application

Computer-assisted telephone interviewing (CATI) is a telephone surveying technique in which the interviewer follows a script provided by a software application. It is a structured system of microdata collection by telephone that speeds up the collection and editing of microdata and also permits the interviewer to educate the respondents on the importance of timely and accurate data. The software is able to customize the flow of the questionnaire based on the answers provided, as well as information already known about the participant. It is used in B2B services and corporate sales.

CATI may function in the following manner:

- A computerized questionnaire is administered to respondents over the telephone.
- The interviewer sits in front of a computer screen.
- Upon command, the computer dials the telephone number to be called.
- When contact is made, the interviewer reads the questions posed on the computer screen and records the respondent's answers directly into the computer.
- Interim and update reports can be compiled instantaneously, as the data are being collected.
- CATI software has built-in logic, which also enhances data accuracy.
- The program will personalize questions and control for logically incorrect answers, such as percentage answers that do not add up to 100 percent.
- The software has built-in branching logic, which will skip questions that are not applicable or will probe for more detail when warranted.
- Automated dialers are usually deployed to lower the waiting time for the interviewer, as well as to record the interview for quality purposes.

== Automated computer telephone interviewing ==
Automated computer telephone interviewing (ACTI) is a technique by which a computer with speaker-independent voice recognition capabilities asks respondents a series of questions, recognizes then stores the answers, and is able to follow scripted logic and branch intelligently according to the flow of the questionnaire based on the answers provided, as well as information known about the participant. This technique is also referred to as interactive voice response (IVR).

== See also ==
- Computer-assisted personal interviewing
- Computer-assisted web interviewing
- Random digit dialling
