= Computer-assisted personal interviewing =

Interviewing technique

Computer-assisted personal interviewing (CAPI) is an interviewing technique in which the respondent or interviewer uses an electronic device to answer the questions. It is similar to computer-assisted telephone interviewing, except that the interview takes place in person instead of over the telephone. This method is usually preferred over a telephone interview when the questionnaire is long and complex. It has been classified as a personal interviewing technique because an interviewer is usually present to serve as a host and to guide the respondent. If no interviewer is present, the term Computer-Assisted Self Interviewing (CASI) may be used. An example of a situation in which CAPI is used as the method of data collection is the British Crime Survey.

Characteristics of this interviewing technique are:

- Either the respondent or an interviewer operates a device (this could be a laptop, a tablet or a smartphone) and answers a questionnaire.
- The questionnaire is an application that takes the respondent through a set of questions using a pre-designed route based on answers given by the respondent.
- Help screens and courteous error messages are provided.
- Colorful screens and on and off-screen stimuli can add to the respondent's interest and involvement in the task.
- This approach is used in shopping malls, preceded by the intercept and screening process.
- CAPI is also used to interview households, using sampling techniques like random walk to get a fair representation of the area that needs to be interviewed.
- It is also used to conduct business-to-business research at trade shows or conventions.

== Advantages CAPI ==
- The face-to-face setting allows the interviewer to capture verbal and non-verbal feedback.
- Personal interviewing allows for interviews of longer duration. Interviews of 45 minutes or more are not uncommon.
- Modern devices can record audio feedback from respondent, track GPS location and allows pictures to be taken of the interview, thus adding to the quality of the data.
- There is no need to transcribe the results into a computer form. The computer program can be constructed so as to place the results directly in a format that can be read by statistical analysis programs such as PSPP or DAP.
- The presence of an interviewer helps when probing for spontaneous awareness of certain topics.
- The interviewer can verify that the respondent answering the questions is the person that needs to be interviewed.

== Disadvantages CAPI ==
- It is a relatively expensive means of interviewing.
- In comparison to web interviewing it can be more time consuming to gather data.

== Computer-Assisted Self Interviewing (CASI) ==
The big difference between a computer-assisted self interview (CASI) and a computer-assisted personal interview (CAPI) is that in the latter an interviewer is present, but not in the former. There are two kinds of computer-assisted self interviewing: a "video-CASI" and an "audio-CASI". Both types of computer-assisted self interviewing might have a big advantage over computer-assisted personal interviewing, because subjects could be more inclined to answer sensitive questions. The reason for this is that they feel that a CASI is more private due to the absence of an interviewer.

== Advantages CASI ==
This form of interview is substantially cheaper when a large number of respondents is required, because:

- There is no need to recruit or pay interviewers. Respondents are able to fill in the questionnaires themselves.
- The program can be placed on a web site, potentially attracting a worldwide audience.
- Another advantage is that there is more likely hood of getting true and honest responses from the subjects in very sensitive matters.

== Disadvantages CASI ==
- The survey is likely to attract only respondents who are "computer savvy", thus introducing potential bias to the survey.
- The survey can miss feedback and clarification/quality control that a personal interviewer could provide. For example, a question that should be interpreted in a particular way, but could also be interpreted differently, can raise questions for respondents. If no interviewer is present, these questions will not be answered, potentially causing bias in the results of the questionnaire.

== Video-CASI ==
Video-CASI are often used to make a complex questionnaire more understandable for the person that is being interviewed. With video-CASI, respondents read questions as they appear on the screen and enter their answers with the keyboard (or some other input device). The computer takes care of the "housekeeping" or administrative tasks for the respondent. The advantages of video-CASI are automated control of complex question routing, the ability to tailor questions based on previous responses, real-time control of out-of-range and inconsistent responses, and the general standardization of the interview.

Video-CASI possesses significant disadvantages, however. Most obviously, video-CASI demands that the respondent can read with some facility. A second, more subtle disadvantage is that, at least with the character-based displays of many video-CASI applications of today, the visual and reading burden imposed on the respondent appears to be much greater than with an attractively designed paper form. The size of the characters and other qualities of the computer user interface seem to demand more reading and computer screen experience than that possessed by many who might be competent readers of printed material. Graphical user interfaces (GUI) may reduce or eliminate this problem, but the present software used to developed video-CASI applications usually lacks this feature.

== Audio-CASI ==
Audio-CASI (sometimes called Telephone-CASI) asks respondents questions in an auditory fashion. Audio-CASI has the same advantage as Video-CASI in that it can make a complex questionnaire more understandable for the person that is being interviewed. It provides privacy (or anonymity) of response equivalent to that of paper self-administered questionnaires (SAQs). In contrast to Video-CASI, Audio-CASI proffers these potential advantages without limiting data collection to the literate segment of the population.

By adding simultaneous audio renditions of each question and instruction aloud, audio-CASI can remove the literacy barriers to self-administration of either Video-CASI or SAQ. In audio-CASI, an audio box is attached to the computer; respondents put on headphones and listen to the question and answer choices as they are displayed on the screen. Respondents have the option of turning off the screen so that people coming into the room cannot read the questions, turning off the sound if they can read faster than the questions are spoken, or keeping both the sound and video on as they answer the questions. Respondents can enter a response at any time and move to the next question without waiting for completion of the audio question and answer choices for a question.

The advantages of audio-CASI, then, are that the addition of audio makes CASI fully applicable to a very wide range of respondents. Persons with limited or no reading abilities are able to listen, understand, and respond to the full content of the survey instrument. Observers of audio-CASI interviews also often report that even with seemingly strong readers, audio-CASI interviews seem to more effectively and fully capture respondents’ concentration. This may be because wearing headphones increases the insulation of the respondent for external stimuli, and also may be explained by the fact that the recorded human voice in the audio component evokes a more personalized interaction between the respondent and the instrument.

== Research on computer-assisted interviewing ==
Computer-assisted interviewing methods such as CAPI, CATI, or CASI, have been the focus of systematic reviews on the effects of computer-assisted interviewing on data quality. Those reviews indicate that computer-assisted methods are accepted by both interviewers and respondents, and these methods tend to improve data quality. Waterton and Duffy (1984) compared reports of alcohol consumption under CASI and personal interviews. Overall, reports of alcohol consumption were 30 percent higher under the CASI procedure, and reports of liquor consumption were 58 percent higher.

In a study that compared Audio-CASI with paper SAQs and Video-CASI, researchers showed that both Audio- and Video-CASI systems work well even with subjects who do not have extensive familiarity with computers. Indeed, respondents preferred the Audio- and Video-CASI to paper SAQs. The computerized systems also eliminated errors in execution of “skip” instructions that occurred when subjects completed paper SAQs. In a number of instances, the computerized systems also appeared to encourage more complete reporting of sensitive behaviors such as use of illicit drugs. Among the two CASI systems, respondents rated Audio-CASI more favorably than Video-CASI in terms of interest, ease of use, and overall preference.

== See also ==
- Computer-assisted web interviewing
