= Online ethnography =

Application of ethnographical research methods on the Internet

Online ethnography (also known as virtual ethnography or digital ethnography) is an online research method that adapts ethnographic methods to the study of the communities and cultures created through computer-mediated social interaction. As modifications of the term ethnography, cyber-ethnography, online ethnography and virtual ethnography (as well as many other methodological neologisms) designate particular variations regarding the conduct of online fieldwork that adapts ethnographic methodology. There is no canonical approach to cyber-ethnography that prescribes how ethnography is adapted to the online setting. Instead individual researchers are left to specify their own adaptations. Netnography is another form of online ethnography or cyber-ethnography with more specific sets of guidelines and rules, and a common multidisciplinary base of literature and scholars. This article is not about a particular neologism, but the general application of ethnographic methods to online fieldwork as practiced by anthropologists, sociologists, and other scholars.

== Introduction ==
Traditional ethnography study observes the interactions between individuals who are co-located. Ethnographies of online cultures and communities extend ethnographic study to settings where interactions are technologically mediated, not face-to-face. Cyber-ethnography therefore addresses limitations in the traditional notion of a field site as a localized space. It also understands that online communities can create a shared culture through digitally mediated interactions. Although the assertion that ethnographic fieldwork can be meaningfully applied to computer-mediated interactions has been contested, it is increasingly becoming accepted.

Like other early internet researchers, early cyber-ethnographers such as Sandy Stone and Sherry Turkle observed that participants in online role-playing communities enact social performances that can diverge dramatically from their offline personas. This led to the idea that online identities can be segmented from offline ones. Cyber-ethnography was seen as a new kind of methodology that might uncover how the internet would radically change society. However, as the internet reached the mainstream and cyber-ethnographers sought legitimacy, cyber-ethnography was reframed as an adaptation of traditional methods into a new context. Understanding the degree to which divergent performances in online and offline settings reflect a segmentation of identity or a continuous identity performed differently in different contexts remains an important consideration for cyber ethnographers.

Many other aspects of online, computer-mediated, or virtual, interaction and community formation are distinct from their in-person, real life, or face-to-face counterparts. Of central importance is that many interactions in online communities are textual. While these textual artifacts resemble the traces of interaction, they constitute the interactions of interest to the cyberethnographer. They are a different kind of interaction in which body language and other kinds of social cues are absent or translated into signs and text.

The character and level of access available to researchers of online communities are also particular to cyber-ethnography. Whereas face-to-face interactions are ephemeral as they occur, online social interactions are often automatically saved and archived, creating permanent accurate records. Also, distinctions between private and public spaces are often unclear in online communities. Cyber-ethnography attempts to adapt participant-observation procedures such as making cultural entrée, collecting and analyzing data, and conducting ethical research to these computer-mediated contingencies.

Cyber-ethnography has significantly developed with the emergence of new technologies. Almost since their inception, some researchers have acted as lurkers and conducted purely observational studies of online cultures and communities rather than as participant observers in an online community. This approach has been criticized by scholars who argue that researchers should fully participate as members of the online community. These scholars value the traditional ethnographic standards of participant observation, prolonged engagement, and deep immersion. Cyber-ethnography, like traditional ethnography often aims to produce a thick description that can help an outsider understand the meaning of behavior in a culture or community. This focus on participation and immersion makes these approaches quite distinct from qualitative internet research methods like online interviews, and online content analysis. Ethnographic methods are also quite different from quantitative Internet research methods like web usage mining or social network analysis. However some researchers complementary research methods along with cyber-ethnography in order to triangulate their findings.

== The range of methodologies ==
Ethnographers have approached the study of the Internet in a range of different ways. A variety of terms refer to various formulations of methodological approaches to cyber-ethnography. Many of these seek to maintain their own dialogue with the established tradition of ethnography. Each formulates its relation to the established anthropological tradition in different (and sometimes inconsistent) ways. Some think that ethnographies conducted online involve a distinctive methodological approach. Others think that cyber-ethnography is not a distinctive form of ethnography although researching the Internet ethnographically forces us to reflect on fundamental assumptions and concepts of ethnography.

Methods choices need to be directly adapted to the kind of questions a researcher seeks to answer. The main advantages of cyber-ethnography reside in the scope and scale of the available data. Other advantages include seeking input directly from participants. For example, posting raw fieldnotes on a blog and allowing participants to leave comments can provide transparency. Cyber-ethnography also allows for a variety of data collection types and including audiovisual formats, on various platforms such as websites, social networks and forums.

=== Offline participant observation ===
It is important for cyber-ethnographers to consider whether online interactions are sufficient for them to develop a deep understanding the community. It is not clear whether identity performances in online environments should be thought of as disjoint from offline identities or if they are continuous with offline identities. When researchers feel that understanding the relationship between the online and offline identities of members is necessary, they may seek to meet with informants face-to-face.

Urban ethnographer Jeffrey Lane suggests that it may increasingly be necessary to weave online and offline identities of informants together in order to create an accurate portrayal of urban street life. He borrows media scholar Danah Boyd’s concept of “networked publics,” which are “simultaneously (1) the space constructed through networked technologies and (2) the imagined collective that emerges as a result of the intersection of people, technology, and practice,” to frame his argument. Interactions that take place offline may appear one way to a participant observer but are further contextualized when examining online forms of communication between the same parties involved in the offline interaction. In the same way, information that is transmitted online can significantly influence activities that take place offline. For instance, one of Lane’s informants encounters a video on Twitter suggesting that there are violent incidents taking place in the area. In response, he sends a text blast to all of his contacts to be cautious that evening. In order to preserve the construction of a networked public, researchers should take into consideration both online and offline identities and activities of individuals. Lane also acknowledges that not all scholars may agree with his argument, but they will eventually have to face the issue as advancements in technology continue to increase.

However, other cyber-ethnographers have argued that difference between online and offline selves is similar to the different identity performances that occur in other contexts. This perspective views identity issues in cyber-ethnography as consistent with those of traditional ethnography. Researchers should thus consider how community members relate their online and offline selves. If it is normal for community members to bring together their online and offline identities and meet face-to-face then it makes sense that the ethnographer should observe or participate in these offline interactions in order to fully understand the community as was done by Sherry Turkle. This finding has been supported by Sara Ross in her work on legal anthropology in urban settings such as Toronto, Canada.

However, many cyber-ethnographers including Hine and Walstrom believe that participant observation in the offline setting can be biased by asymmetry between the researcher and the member. This is because community members who rely on computer mediated communication may be at a disadvantage to a researcher who understands their online interactions, but also employs face-to-face communication. As it is often the case that researchers are interested in understanding the interactions in the online context and that comparing online and offline identity is not important, credible ethnographic studies can be done in online-only contexts.

=== Limitations ===
One of the main disadvantages of online ethnography is the need for the ethnographer to possess certain technology-based skills. Some studies might only require elementary computer skills, but others may require advanced knowledge of technologies and tools such as web-based applications, analytical tools, and computer programming. The development of such technologies tends to grow faster than the methodology literature thus "there is little consensus on how [to] best collect and analyze new media data".

The temporal nature of online data can also be an issue. Cyber-ethnographers might ask, "What is data of the present?" Robinson (2011) states that in cases such as YouTube videos and subsequent comments, "the present cyber-reality may be interpreted as a continual accumulation of all past input by members or participants". Cyber-ethnographers also need to think of their own identities and how "[it] might become part of a feedback loop with those he/she is studying" and whether or not it eschews the data collected and the integrity of the study. Thus, there is a need for cyber-ethnographers to be particularly flexible and reflexive in their practice of ethnography.

Another limitation of cyber-ethnography is that it complicates matters of privacy. Although researchers have always had to take people who were not originally part of an ethnographic study into consideration, cyber-ethnography allows researchers to actually see “identifiable records of these connections and interactions.” As a result, researchers may have to take extra precaution in asking informants’ for their permission to participate in their research, as well as in concealing the identities of said informants.

== Ethics ==
To the extent that cyber-ethnography is similar to ethnography in a localized space, it will raise similar ethical considerations. However, the nature of the online space does raise new ethical issues, including those related to informed consent of human subjects, protections of privacy or anonymity of research subjects, and whether cyber-ethnography might be a form of "electronic eavesdropping." In spite of these differences, the American Anthropological Association has yet to include any specific recommendations regarding cyber-ethnography in its Code of Ethics.

Thus, there are significant ethical issues around the use of digital tools, data collection from cyberspace, and whether cyberethnographers respect privacy in cyberspace. That a website is not password-protected against a researcher does not necessarily imply that it is open space where the right to anonymity and privacy dissolve. Thus, Robinson (2011) insists, "if our identities in cyberspace are extensions of our off-line identities, they must be afforded the same ethical consideration as they would be given in the off-line world".

Institutional review boards (IRBs) may not be equipped for ethical dilemmas presented by cyber-ethnography. Researchers need to make their intentions clear and define properly what data will be collected. When researchers "lurk" by covertly observing and gathering data, they do not gain participants' knowledge and consent. This conflicts with the traditional ethnographic practice of informed consent, in which participants have the right to learn about the study at hand and make an informed decision on whether or not to participate. Cyber-ethnographers face the challenge of informing participants of their presence and research activities without jeopardizing their ability to collect valid data. Scholars recommend including a note in the researcher's posts that identifies their research interest and links to more information. However, this practice is only possible in some online spaces, such as forums, but not in others.

Another issue is that the technological innovations and possibility for new research outpace the creation of clear and adapted ethical guidelines. Nonetheless, some guidelines do exist and are regularly updated by the Association of Internet Researchers (AoIR).

Another ethical constraint and a possible disadvantage to cyber-ethnography is the intricate anonymization of the data. Protecting participant anonymity often conflicts with the preservation of the participants' words. Although consent might be obtained from participants to collect, use and publish textual data, the simple use of pseudonyms is in most cases not enough to guarantee the anonymity of the data. Indeed, searching for direct quotes in a Google search is often sufficient to identify participants. Anyone can potentially have access to search results revealing the author and their identity. To mitigate this issue, many scholars choose to paraphrase textual data to avoid source identification. Thus, "ethical concerns must be reexamined in light of new technologies for both subjects and researchers alike".

== See also ==
- Anthropology of cyberspace
- Networks of practice
- Online research community
- Social networks
- Virtual community
- Virtual community of practice
