= Annette Markham =

American academic

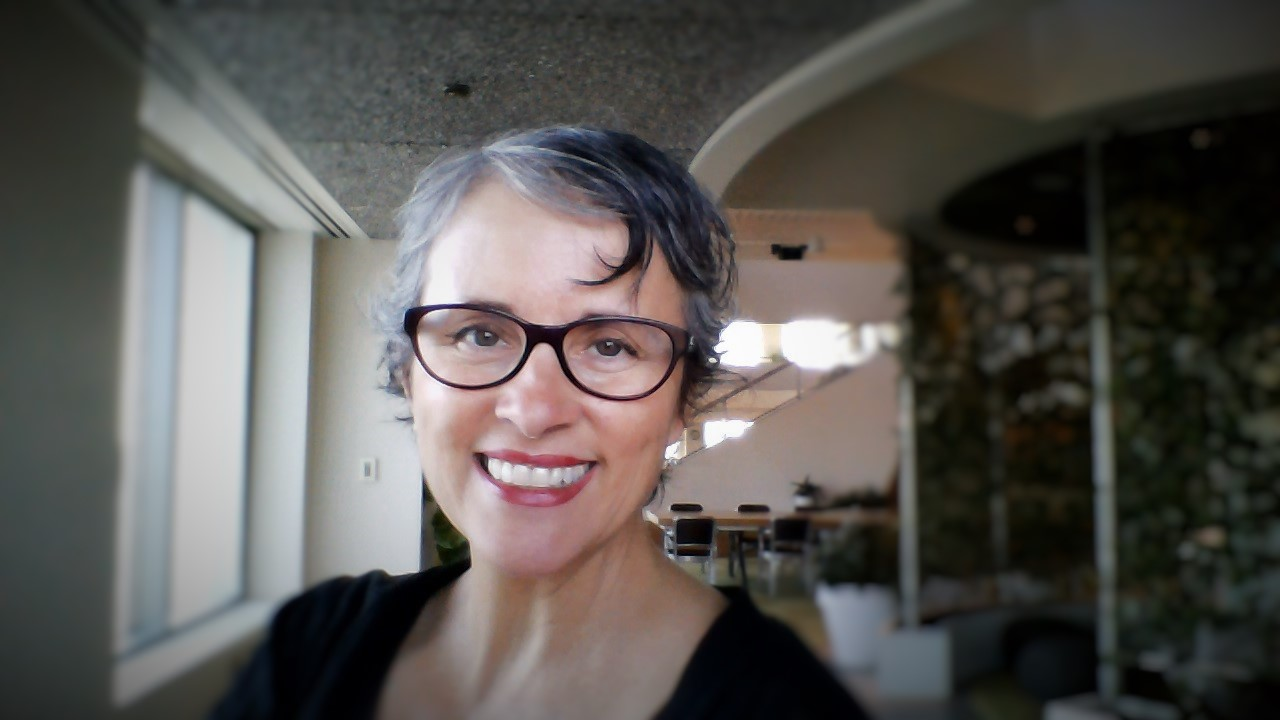
- Markham at Microsoft Research Cambridge in 2015
- Education: Purdue University, Washington State University, Idaho State University
- Known for: Social impact of human-machine interactions and Ethics of artificial intelligence, Qualitative research methods, critical pedagogy and Digital literacy, Internet research ethics, Digital and Online Ethnography
- Scientific career
- Fields: Critical data studies, symbolic interactionism, Science and technology studies, Internet studies, Information Studies,
- Workplaces: Utrecht University, RMIT, Aarhus University, Umea University, Loyola University Chicago, University of the Virgin Islands, University of Illinois Chicago, Virginia Tech
- Thesis: Going online: An ethnographic narrative (1997)
- Website: www.annettemarkham.com

Annette Markham is an American academic, Chair Professor of Media Literacy and Public Engagement at Utrecht University, honorary adjunct professor at RMIT University in Melbourne, and current Director of Utrecht University's Futures+ Literacies + Methods Lab. Former Director of RMIT's Digital Ethnography Research Centre. She served on the executive committee of the Association of Internet Researchers from 2013-2018. She publishes research in the area of Internet studies, critical data studies and digital literacies, social interaction, innovative qualitative methods for social research, and Internet research ethics.

== Publications ==
Markham has authored more than 50 articles since 1995. Her first book, Life Online: Researching real experience in virtual space, was published in 1998, which reviewers called "a definitive sociological study of what it's like to be on the net" and "a bold move in the exponentially increasingly field of internet studies....that allows the reader to appreciate the challenges of applying contemporary ethnographic methods to online populations." In 2009, Markham edited an internet research methods volume titled Internet Inquiry: Conversations about method with Nancy Baym. In 2020, Markham and coauthor Katrin Tiidenberg published a followup to Life Online in the form of a curated collection involving 30 contributors, titled Metaphors of Internet: Ways of being in the age of Ubiquity.

Markham has published multiple pieces on Internet research ethics. She is the primary author of the Association of Internet Researchers' official 2012 ethical guidelines for internet research. The framework of this document uses Markham's earlier published works linking ethics to methods, first in a Norwegian edited volume in 2003 and later in the Journal of Information Ethics. In reviewing ethical frameworks, the Handbook of Internet Studies cites Markham's convincing arguments that "methodological choices inform and are informed by ethical choices." Markham's concepts of 'ethics as method' and 'ethics as impact' are highlighted in encyclopedic discussions of research ethics and scientific integrity.

Markham's arguments around qualitative methods focus on the importance of context sensitivity, flexible adaptation, and reflexivity. These concepts have been foundational for developing conceptual frameworks for innovative approaches to fieldwork, methods for online interviewing, or reflexivity in data science Markham is cited as a key figure and 'recommended reading' for researching digital contexts in textbooks and handbooks on qualitative research practice.

Markham maintains a blog about a range of conceptual and pragmatic issues related to lived experience in 21st Century contexts of complexity at https://annettemarkham.com.

== Education ==
- Ph.D. Purdue University, August 1997, Organizational Communication
- M. S. Washington State University, Edward R. Murrow College of Communication, May 1993, Speech Communication
- B. S. Idaho State University, May 1988, Communication, cum laude

== Books ==
- Harris, D., Luka, M.E., &Markham, A. (2022). Massive/Micro Autoethnography: Creative Learning in COVID Times: Singapore: Springer. ISBN 978-981-16-8305-3
- Markham, A. & Tiidenberg, K. (2020). Metaphors of Internet: Ways of being in the age of Ubiquity: London, UK: Peter Lang. ISBN 978-1-4331-7450-6
- Markham, A. & Baym, N. (2009). Internet Inquiry: Conversations about method. Thousand Oaks, CA: Sage. ISBN 1452278768
- Markham, A. (1998). Life Online: Researching real experiences in virtual space. Walnut Creek, CA: AltaMira Press. ISBN 0761990313
