= Internet research =

Using Internet-based information or resources in research

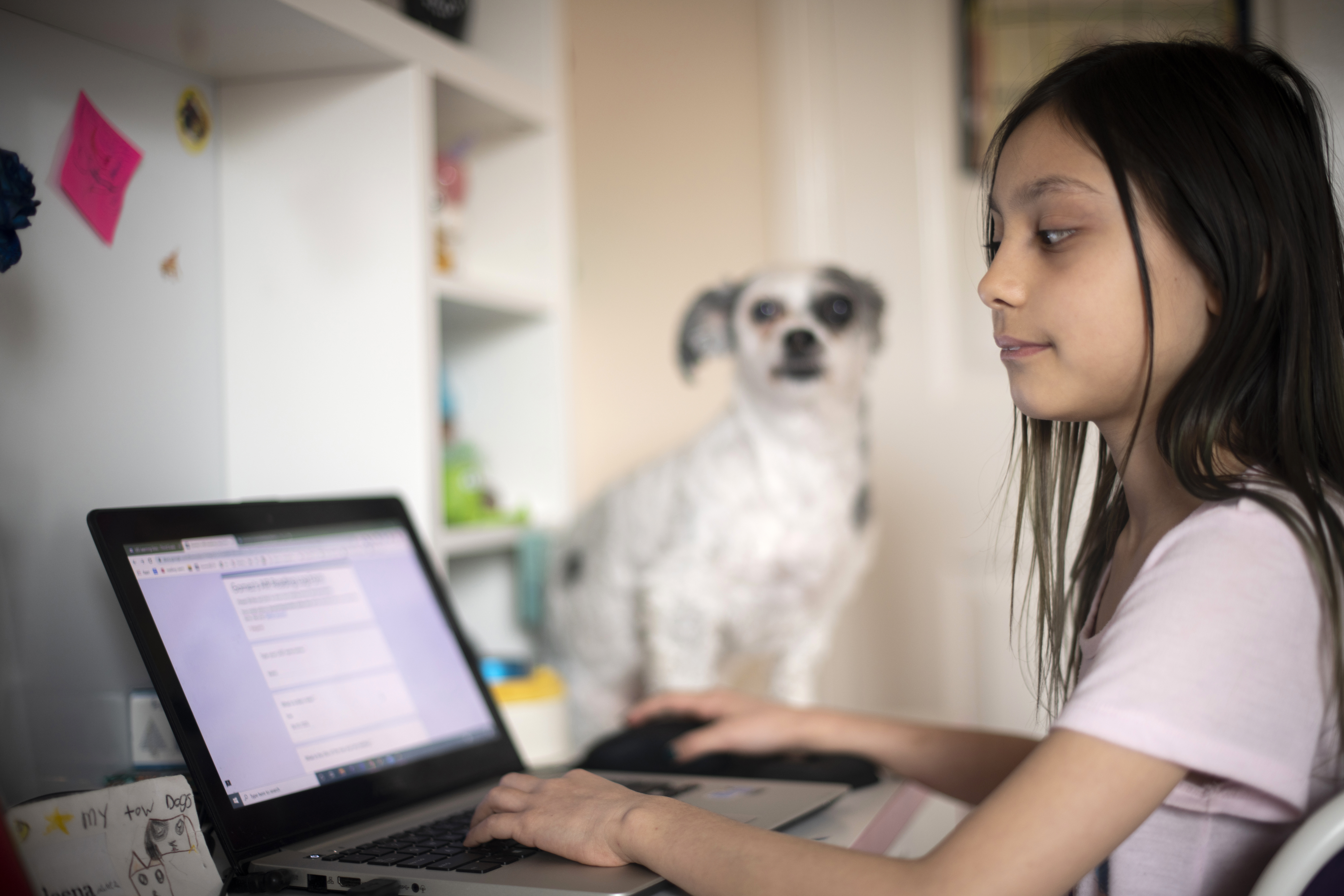
A student uses the Internet to do research for a homework assignment

Internet research is the practice of using data from the Internet, especially free information on the World Wide Web and Internet-based resources (like online forums and social media), in research.

== Characterization ==
Internet research has had a profound impact on the way ideas are formed and knowledge is created. Through web search, pages with some relation to a given search word or phrase can be visited and analyzed. In addition, the web can be used to connect with relevant people and conduct online interviews and other types of research. Communication tools used for internet research include email (including mailing lists), online discussion groups (including message boards and BBSes), social media and other personal communication facilities (instant messaging, IRC, newsgroups, etc.).

=== Related activities ===
Internet research is distinct from library research, in that libraries provide access to institutional publications, which in some instances can be more reliable, however the line between the two is becoming less distinct. The term "internet research" resembles "scientific research" because of the word "research", but they denote different types of activity; the first refers to online information gathering and analysis, whereas the second usually implies empirical experiments. Internet research is also distinct from internet search as internet research involves analysing and evaluating data found and/or collected.

=== Related fields ===
A distinction between internet studies and internet research, is that the former is the study of the distinct kinds of human interaction done on the internet, whereas internet research could study aspects other than behavior: technology, outcomes, etc.

Library and information science studies information, specifically how it is managed and deployed and can involve studying online data sources.

Human–computer interaction is the study of the design and the use of computer technology, with a focus on the interfaces between people humans and computers.

== Search tools ==
Search tools for finding information on the internet include web search engines, the search engines on individual websites, meta search engines, web directories, and specialty search services.

=== Web search ===
Web search allows a user to enter a search query, in the form of keywords or a phrase, into either a search box or form, and then finds matching results and displays them on the screen.

=== Websites' search feature ===
Websites often have a search engine of their own, for searching just the site's content, often displayed at the top of every page. Wikipedia provides a search engine for exploring its content.

=== Specialty search tools ===
Specialty search tools enable users to find information that conventional search engines cannot access because the content is stored in databases. The vast majority of information on the web is stored in databases that require users to go to a specific site and access it through a search form. Often, the content is generated dynamically. Web crawlers are unable to index this information. This has led to the term invisible or deep web. Specialty search tools have evolved to provide users with the means to find deep web content. These specialty tools rely on advanced bot and intelligent agent technologies to search the deep web.

== Internet research software ==
A variety of internet research software can be used to collect and analyse data. Methods used include online surveys, online polls, online focus groups, online interviews and content and social media analysis tools. The data can then be stored, analysed and evaluated. Other research software tools allow data collected to be analysed, edited and annotated and some have the ability to export to other formats. Features of some software include textual and statistical analysis.

== Challenges ==
Given the internet provides access globally to vast amounts of data, this presents challenges including being able to find and locate relevant and reliable information when so much information is available, verifying the writers credentials, results being impacted by unrecognised bias and in being able to organise a diverse range of data types, such as structured, semi-structured and unstructured data. The requirement and importance of critically evaluating sources of data and developing the skills needed to do this, is pertinent to ensure reliability, relevance and accuracy. Critical evaluation is particularly important due to online misinformation, disinformation and AI-generated content. Whilst AI search engines and AI-powered research assistance tools, can assist internet research, by (for example) summarising academic research and analysing data, the reliability of generative AI can be problematic, sometimes resulting in AI hallucination. Ethical challenges such as privacy, managing personally identifiable data and gaining informed consent can also be challenging when conducting internet research.

== See also ==
- How to use Wikipedia for research
- Data care
- Open access citation advantage
- Inquiry-based learning
- Internet Research (journal)
- CRAAP test
- Web literacy
- Association of Internet Researchers

== See also ==
- Internet research ethics
