= Online research methods =

Ways in which researchers collect data via the Internet

Online research methods (ORMs) are ways in which researchers can collect data via the internet. They are also referred to as Internet research, Internet science, or Web-based methods. Many of these online research methods are related to existing research methodologies but re-invent and re-imagine them in the light of new technologies and conditions associated with the internet. The field is relatively new and evolving. With the growth of social media, a new level of complexity and opportunity has been created. The inclusion of social media research can provide unique insights into consumer and societal segments and gaining an "emotional" measure of a population on issues of interest.

Some specific types of method include:

- Cyber-ethnography
- Online content analysis
- Online focus groups
- Online interviews
- Online qualitative research
- Online questionnaires
- Social network analysis
- Web-based experiments
- Online clinical trials – or see below

== Online clinical trials ==
Clinical trials are at the heart of current evidence-based medical care. They are, however, traditionally expensive and difficult to undertake. Using internet resources can, in some cases, reduce the economic burden, and may have other benefits in Medicine. Paul et al., in The Journal of Medical Internet Research, describe the background and methodologies of online clinical trials and list examples.

== Research in and with social media ==
The advent of social media has recently led to new online research methods, for example data mining of large datasets from such media or web-based experiments within social media that are entirely under the control of researchers, e.g. those created with the software Social Lab.

== See also ==
- Internet mediated research
- Multiple site entry technique
