= Online qualitative research =

Online qualitative research refers to focus groups, individual depth interviews (IDIs) and other forms of qualitative research conducted online rather than face to face or via telephone.

== Types of online qualitative research ==
In addition to online focus groups and IDIs, online qualitative research can include diaries, blogs, market research online communities (MROCs), and ethnography. There are two main forms of online focus group, synchronous and asynchronous.

Individual depth interviews (IDIs) - Traditionally conducted face to face or by telephone, IDIs typically involve an interview between the researcher and the research participant lasting 30–60 minutes.

Diaries and blogs - In this type of research, participants record information over a given time period, as specified by the researcher. Often, this method is used to ensure that participants undertake (and make a record of) certain tasks before taking part in focus groups. When diaries are used, the information is not shared with other participants. Conversely, when using blogs the information is shared both with participants and researchers.

Market research communities (Insight communities) - These typically involve participants taking part in various research activities over a period of time, rather than taking part in one research event, such as an online focus group. The activities often include short surveys, quick polls, online focus groups, and participant-led discussion forums. One could argue that communities are either a form of quantitative or qualitative research, depending on the number of participants and the nature of the research tasks they undertake. Market research communities (MROC's) have seen a significant development in the U.S and are starting to reach the European market. A community can be seen as a place where "traditional" research and innovation tools are utilized in one single platform over a period of time. Short communities consist of a period of time between 1 week and 6 months, while an ongoing community is anything beyond 6 months. Market researchers usually adopt online communities through third-party technology suppliers.

== Benefits of online qualitative research ==
The online approach can offer significant time and cost savings compared to other methods, and provides much greater convenience for researchers, participants and observers. It also allows for greater sophistication in the segmentation of the sample because participants can be recruited online, whether from databases, panels, surveys or other sources, rather than just by traditional means.

Setting up and running an online qualitative research project involves far less administration than is the case with face to face qualitative research, and this makes it practical for client-side organisations to do so without a market research agency. This is further supported by the fact that the process of moderation is easier online than face to face, because the moderator is not dealing with people together in a room. In fact, one could argue that an important benefit of online qualitative research is that it is much less dependent on the moderator than is face to face research.

Other benefits include geographical independence - participants can be from different parts of the country or even the world.

Online methodologies are also useful when researching sensitive topics where the anonymity of participants needs to be ensured.

== Online qualitative research results ==
It is argued by some that online qualitative research results cannot be as “good” as face to face research results, because of the absence of face to face contact between participants and a moderator. A moderator, it is argued, can interpret participants’ tone of voice or body language in a way that is not possible online.

The counter argument to this is that in a face to face environment there are numerous reasons why participants should not be as honest or forthcoming as they would be in an anonymous online environment. Therefore, the moderator is needed in order to help overcome these reasons. For example, the participant might feel their honest answer makes them look stupid, selfish or unhelpful and so they give a different answer. Or they might have a different view to the majority of the group, but are reluctant to mention it for fear of this leading to the moderator focusing on them for a long period of time.

== See also ==
- Internet mediated research
