= Rony Rodrigues =

Brazilian advertising executive (born 1979)

Rony Rodrigues (Porto Alegre, April 30, 1979) is a Brazilian advertising executive and business owner.

Rogrigues is the founding partner of O’Grupo, a holding company with four companies: Acquiris, electronic games; LiveAd, advertising; TalkInc, online research; and Box 1824, a research agency specialized in young people's consumer and behavior trends.

== Career ==
At age 16, Rodrigues opened a bar at the Planeta Atlântida festival. After high school, he studied Tourism for a semester at Pontifícia Universidade Católica do Rio Grande do Sul (PUC-RS). He then decided to work in advertising.

After one year working in advertising, Rodrigues won a Cannes Lions award, the first to be received by someone from Rio Grande do Sul. The ad that won him the prize was created for Senador, a deodorant brand. The ad consisted of a sticker that was glued on bus handrails with the following sentence: “Raise your hand if you use Senador.”

In 2003, Rodrigues founded Box 1824 together with João Mognon Cavalcanti. In 2012, he was named one of the most innovative Brazilians in the digital segment by Proxxima magazine. In 2012, Rodrigues also became a partner in an independent fashion brand, Cotton Project.

== Box 1824 ==
In 2007, Box 1824 was nominated for a Caboré Award, in the Specialized Services category. In 2009, it was also nominated for an Excellence Award for Best Paper in the market research conference, ESOMAR.

Rodrigues and Box 1824 have produced the videos We All Want to Be Young and All Work and All Play, a summary of the results of several research projects over a five-year period about young people's behavior, giving special attention to the millennials. Box 1824 is also responsible for the Sonho Brasileiro (Brazilian Dream) research project. Box 1824's clients include Unilever, PepsiCo, Itaú, FIAT, Nike, Inc. and C&A.
