= Customer advisory council =

A Customer Advisory Council (also referred to as a Customer Advisory Board or CAB) is a form of market research whereby a group of existing customers is convened on a regular basis to advise company management on industry trends, business priorities, and strategic direction. The CAB differs from traditional focus groups in the following ways:

- Membership is made up of senior executives from customer companies, not product users
- Topics of discussion tend to be more strategic than tactical

== Composition ==
Customer advisory councils and CABs typically consist of 10 to 15 customers selected to represent a cross section of the customer base. Proper selection of attendees requires identifying not only the most strategic customer company, but also the proper individual who can best represent their company's needs, priorities, and directions. Key individuals who have a strong relationship with the sponsoring company and have valuable ideas to contribute are ideal candidates. Membership may also benefit from a few outspoken customers who have voiced strong complaints in the past about existing business practice.

== Frequency and format ==
It is common practice for customer advisory councils to meet 1-2 times per year. More frequent meetings are usually not practical due to time constraints of participants. Furthermore, it takes a significant amount of time to process the advisory council recommendations and implement them within the existing company strategy.

Meetings are usually held face-to-face for half a day or more. Meetings can also be held via teleconference or through interactive means though the level of 2-way dialogue may suffer. Meeting agendas usually leave ample time for facilitated discussion using a variety of brainstorming and workshop techniques.

== Council member expectations ==
Council members usually participate on a voluntary basis for the opportunity to influence company direction in a way which is beneficial to their own needs as well as the customer community. To maintain credibility it is important that the sponsors are committed to follow through on key recommendations made by the council or at minimum provide a rational explanation for those recommendations which are ultimately not implemented. Participants also typically benefit from the prestige of participation, ability to network with each other as well as with company officers, and opportunity to share best practices and new ideas.

== See also ==
- Focus group
- Online research community
- Observational techniques
