= OACA =

OACA may refer to:

- Athens Olympic Sports Complex, sports venue in Athens, Greece
- Open access citation advantage, bias in academic publishing
- Tunisian Civil Aviation and Airports Authority, Tunisian public sector organization
