= Teksty z Ulicy =

Polish academic journal

- Discipline: Folklore, cultural studies, internet studies
- Language: Polish
- Edited by: Dobrosława Wężowicz-Ziółkowska, Michał Noszczyk

Publication details
- History: 1995–present
- Frequency: Irregular

Standard abbreviations
- ISO 4: Teksty Ulicy

Indexing
- ISSN: 2081-3961 (print); 2081-397X (web)

Links
- Journal homepage

Teksty z Ulicy is a Polish language academic journal covering modern folklore and focusing on internet memes in recent years. It is referred to as the only Polish academic forum for this discipline.

The first issue was published in 1995 with a subtitle of Zeszyt folklorystyczny (English: folklore issue), under the editorship of Dionizjusz Czubala and his wife Marianna Oterman-Czubalina, who died the same year. Dobrosława Wężowicz-Ziółkowska replaced her as co-editor of sporadic annual issues under this subtitle until 2003. Czubala edited the following issue as sole editor, under the same subtitle.

In 2003 Dobrosława became the editor-in-chief and published the 2004 issue under the subtitle Zeszyt kulturoznawczy, with Elena Yazykova as co-editor. The following issues have used the subtitle Zeszyt memetyczny, with Michał Noszczyk as co-editor.
