= Cybermethodology =

Cybermethodology is a field that focuses on the creative development and use of computational and technological research methodologies for the analysis of next-generation data sources such as the Internet. The first formal academic program in Cybermethodology is being developed by the University of California, Los Angeles.

== Background ==
Cybermethodology is an outgrowth of two relatively new academic fields. The first is technology and society. This field focuses on the impact of research and innovation on society, and related policy issues. Many universities, including Berkeley, Cornell, MIT and Stanford offer degrees and/or programs of study in this and related fields. A great strength of technology and society studies is that it exists at the intersection of the natural and social sciences, engineering, and public policy.

The second field closely integrated with cybermethodology is Internet studies. This recently developed field has generated programs at several universities including Minnesota, Washington, Brandeis, and Georgetown. Internet studies involves the study of the fundamental workings of the Internet as well as learning about entities and issues such as Internet security, on-line communities and gaming, Internet culture, and intellectual property.

== Nature ==
Cybermethodology is the component of internet and technology studies that is specifically concerned with the use of innovative technology-based methods of analysis, new sources of data, and conceptualizations in order to gain a better understanding of human behavior. It is characterized by the use, as primary data sources, of emergent entities such as virtual worlds, blogs, texting, on-line gaming (mmorpgs), social networking sites, video sharing, wikis, search engines, and numerous other innovative tools and activities available on the web. Major components of cybermethodology include:

1. Basic Cyber-Literacy, a core knowledge of information technology and Internet tools such as statistical and analytic software, electronic library resources, digital devices, and use of the Internet as a source of data.
2. The Research Life Cycle, knowledge of the data lifecycle from acquisition and input to archiving and accessibility.
3. Non-Linear Technologies, including hyperlinks, dynamics surveys, and technological methods such as neuroimaging.
4. Programming Concepts, including the ability to create new interactive research tools.
5. Analytical Methods and their relationship to different types of data: non-linear, qualitative, spatial, time-variant processes, and agent-based information such as rules of social interaction and agent mental representations.
6. Modes of Interaction extending beyond person-to-person interviews, on-site fieldwork, and anonymous surveys to contemporary environments such as online and virtual communities and interaction through games and virtual environments.
7. Research Presentation including the use of new media techniques, issues raised by intended or unintended rapid dissemination of results by electronic means to untargeted audiences, and the dynamic potentially interactive nature of cyber-research.
8. Meta-Literacy, the ability to critically evaluate the methods, tools, and results of cyber-research.

== See also ==
- Cyberculture
- Cyberinfrastructure
- Cyberpsychology
- Cyberspace
- Scientific method
- Social software
