= Harris Interactive College Football Poll =

Former college football rankings

The Harris Interactive College Football Poll was a weekly ranking of the top 25 NCAA Division I Football Bowl Subdivision college football teams. The rankings were compiled by Harris Interactive, a market research company that specializes in Internet research.

The poll was created in the summer of 2005 to replace the AP Poll in the BCS formula. The AP had decided it no longer wanted to be a part of the formula used by the BCS rankings to determine who plays in the BCS National Championship Game. Unlike the other two seasonal polls, the AP Poll and the Coaches Poll, the Harris Poll did not release a preseason poll; in fact, it did not come out until the last half of October, several weeks into the season. Also, the Harris Poll did not release a post-bowl game poll or crown a national champion; the final Harris Poll was released along with the final BCS rankings.

The Harris Interactive Poll was composed of former players, coaches, administrators, and current and former media who submitted votes for the top 25 teams each week. The panel was designed to be a statistically valid representation of all 11 FBS Conferences and independent institutions.

== Polling methodology ==
First, Division I-Bowl Subdivision college football conferences and independent institutions nominated prospective panelists. Then Harris randomly selected 115 members from the nominees to participate in the actual panel. Each week from mid October to the end of the regular college football season these 115 panelists voted on the particular ranking of teams. These rankings were then published and are used to determine 1/3 of the BCS standings.

== Panelists ==
=== 2005 ===
See full list at: List of 2005 Panelists

=== 2006 ===
See full list at: List of 2006 Panelists

=== 2007 ===
See full list at: List of 2007 Panelists

=== 2008 ===
See full list at: List of 2008 Panelists

=== 2009 ===
See full list at: List of 2009 Panelists

=== 2010 ===
See full list at: List of 2010 Panelists

=== 2011 ===
See full list at: List of 2011 Panelists

=== 2012 ===
See full list at: List of 2012 Panelists

=== 2013 ===
See full list at: List of 2013 Panelists

== Year-by-year Final Rankings ==
The Harris poll's final rankings were from the last week of the regular season for the purpose of producing a final BCS ranking. The Harris poll did not crown a champion in a post-bowl poll.

See results at: Final 2005 Harris Poll
See results at: Final 2006 Harris Poll
See results at: Final 2007 Harris Poll
See results at: Final 2008 Harris Poll
See results at: Final 2009 Harris Poll
See results at: Final 2010 Harris Poll
See results at: Final 2011 Harris Poll
See results at: Final 2012 Harris Poll
See results at: Final 2013 Harris Poll

== See also ==
- NCAA Division I FBS National Football Championship
- List of college bowl games
- AP Poll
- Coaches Poll
- Bowl Championship Series
- Grantland Rice Award
- Mythical National Championship
- Dickinson System
