= Alexander Halavais =

Associate Professor

Alexander M. Campbell Halavais
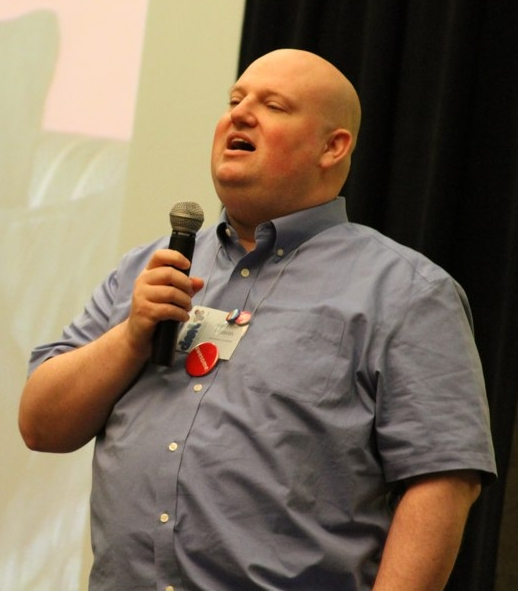
- Alexander Halavais at the Digital Media and Learning Conference March 4, 2011
- Born: July 21, 1971
- Education: University of California, Irvine (B.A. Political Science, 1993); University of Washington (PhD Communications, 2001)
- Spouse: Jamie
- Children: 2
- Scientific career
- Fields: Social computing, Computer-mediated communication
- Workplaces: Arizona State University, Quinnipiac University, University at Buffalo
- Thesis: The Slashdot Effect: Analysis of a Large-Scale Public Conversation on the World Wide Web (2001)
- Website: alex.halavais.net

Alexander Halavais (born July 21, 1971) is an associate professor in the Social Data Science master's program at Arizona State University, a social media researcher and former President of the Association of Internet Researchers. Before joining the faculty at Arizona State University, Halavais taught in the Interactive Media program at Quinnipiac University, the School of Informatics at the University at Buffalo and at the University of Washington.

In 1993, Halavais earned a bachelor's degree in political science from the University of California, Irvine and a Ph.D. in communication from the University of Washington in 2001. His dissertation examined the social implications of the Slashdot website. He also completed coursework in communication and cognitive science at the University of California, San Diego and complex adaptive systems at the Santa Fe Institute.

Online Journalism Review referred to Halavais as one of a number of "blogologists," exploring the ways in which social computing affects the society at large. His work has explored how blogs are used in education, the patterns of international hyperlinks, the benefits and pitfalls of personal branding, and the role of pornography on the Internet. He is the editor of a volume on cyberporn and society.

In one project, Lackaff and Halavais explored Wikipedia's topical coverage using the Library of Congress Classification to compare Wikipedia's coverage with that of Books in Print.

Halavais was an early proponent of hyperlink analysis and webometrics, and has examined the relationship between national borders and hyperlinks, as well as hyperlinks between US cities. With Maria Garrido, he also looked at the linking patterns among global NGOs and grassroots organizations.

To test Wikipedia as a trustworthy source of accurate information, Halavais created one of the more publicized examples of Wikipedia vandalism. He afterwards dubbed it "The Isuzu Experiment". Halavais altered 13 records in Wikipedia to include spurious information. A number of Wikipedia editors spotted the errors, and quickly corrected the articles.

Halavais has written two books--Search Engine Society and An Introduction to Information Studies--and edited a reader on online sex. He has spoken about the role of peer to peer surveillance in participatory government, on the place of digital learning badges, and ethical dimensions of AI and digital research.
