= Multiple site entry technique =

Online research technique

The multiple site entry technique is a strategy that can be used in online research (also called Internet-based research or Web-based research) to target different samples via different recruitment sites and compare their data. It is a method used in behavioral and social research to assess the presence and impact of self-selection effects. Self-selection effects can be considered a major challenge in social science research. With the invention of online research in the 1990s the multiple site entry technique became possible, because the recruitment of participants via different links (URLs) is very easy to implement. It can be assumed that there is no self-selection bias if the data sets coming from different recruitment sites do not differ systematically.

== Method ==
Several links to the study are placed on different websites, in Internet forums, social media platforms, or offline media that are likely to attract different types of participants, or are mailed out to different mailing lists. In order to identify the recruitment sources, the published URLs contain source identifying information and the HTTP protocol is analyzed by different referrer information. This means, a unique string of characters is appended to the URL for each recruitment source, e.g. “...index.html?source=studentlist” for a list of students. The data file will have a column („source“) containing an entry of the referring source for each participant (“studentlist“).

The collected data sets can then be compared for differences in results, and also for differences in relative degree of appeal (measured via dropout), demographic data, central results, and data quality

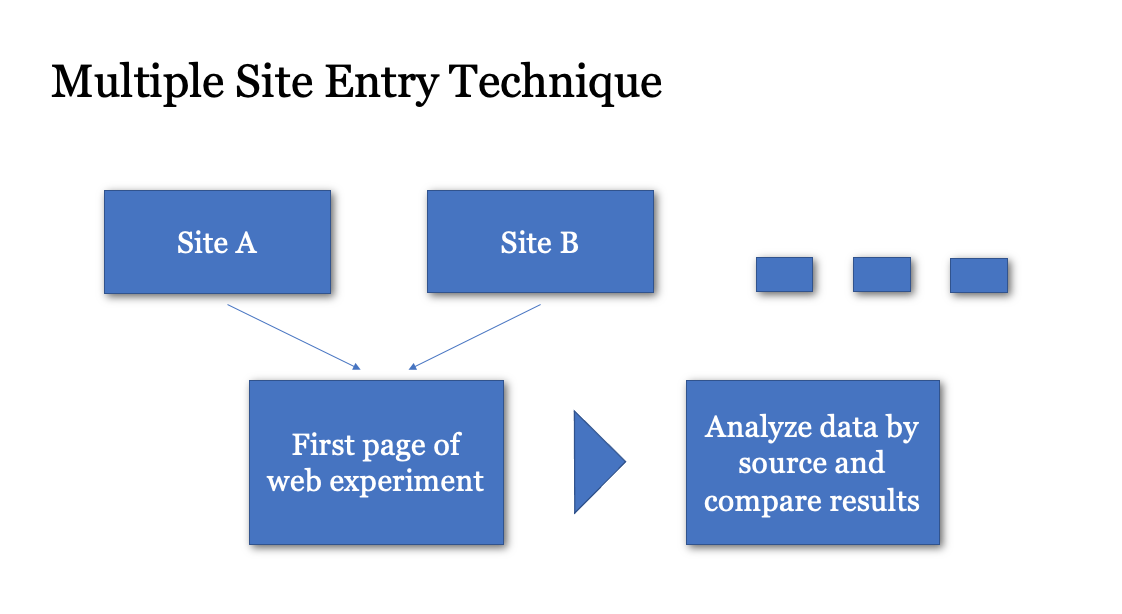

The figure illustrates the multiple site entry technique.

== Impact ==
Several studies have shown that the multiple site entry technique is a useful tool to determine the presence and impact of self-selection in online research (also called Internet-based research, Web-based research). The multiple site entry technique helps to detect potential sampling problems, which in turn ensures the quality and generalizability in the data collection over the Internet. Moreover, this technique can be applied to different kinds of Internet-based studies, e.g. trauma surveys.

== Fields of Application ==
The multiple site entry technique has already been applied successfully in different research areas. For instance, Holbrook and Lavrakas discussed the multiple site entry technique in the field of experimental survey research. Moreover, it can also be used in a broader research context, e.g., in sex research and in health science.
