= Online community manager =

Person

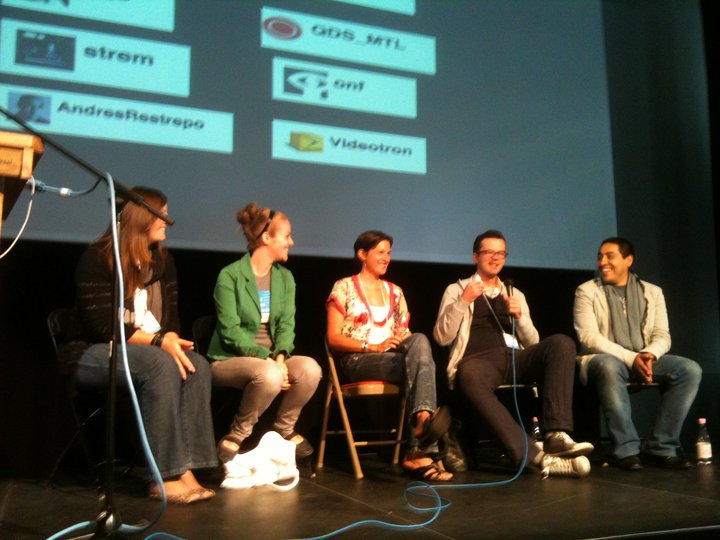
Yul Contenu community managers at PodCamp Montreal 2010

An online community manager builds, grows and manages online communities, performing community management, often around a brand or cause.

== History ==
The most recognized origin of the term (online) community manager is in the computer games industry with the advent of MMORPG (Massively Multiplayer Online Role-playing Games) in the mid 1990s. Roles have expanded to include a wide variety of responsibilities and skill sets including social media management, marketing, product development, PR, and customer support. Game community management often includes supporting open communications between the developer and player community.

While the term "online community manager" may not have been used at the time, the role has also existed since online systems first began offering features and functions that allowed for community creation. These early efforts, in the form of bulletin board systems, had leaders known as system operators or Sysops. The early 1990s saw the growth of mainstream online computer services such as Prodigy, CompuServe and America Online. Prominent features of these services included communities which went by various names; Special Interest Groups, Communities of Interest and so on. And their leaders were often referred to as community managers.

== General roles ==
Online community managers may serve a variety of roles depending on the nature and purpose of their online community, which may or may not be part of a profit-motivated enterprise. Patti Anklam has asserted that "every network has an underlying purpose," and motivations for such network creation include mission, business, idea, learning, or personal. She says such leaders hold the collective vision, create and manage relationships, and manage collaborative processes. Anklam does not distinguish a fundamental difference for these roles as related to the varying purposes of network (i.e., community) creation.

== Professional roles ==
Community managers are involved in the computer games industry, branded online communities, online research communities, corporate blogs, and other social media marketing and research activities.

Roles have expanded to include a wide variety of responsibilities and skill sets, including social media management, marketing, product support and development, PR, and customer support. At the core, community management encompasses a little bit of each of these while retaining its core tenet - ensuring open communications between the developer and community.

=== Culture and appreciation ===
Community Manager Appreciation Day takes place every 4th Monday of January as a way to recognize and celebrate the efforts of community managers around the world using social media and other tools to improve customer experiences. It was created by Jeremiah Owyang in 2010.

People are encouraged to send sincere Thank You notes to their online community managers. People using Twitter include the #CMAD and #CMGR hashtag in their tweets about this event. Many online community managers and vendors in the social media marketplace post blogs in appreciation of their community managers. Cities with large concentrations of Social Media focused businesses, such as Boston, Austin, and San Francisco hold in-person meetup events to celebrate and honor those who represent and support their online communities.

== See also ==
- Community building
- Community of practice
- Internet forum
- Internet social network
- Market research
- Online deliberation
- Social network
- Social media
