= Online interview =

Method of online research

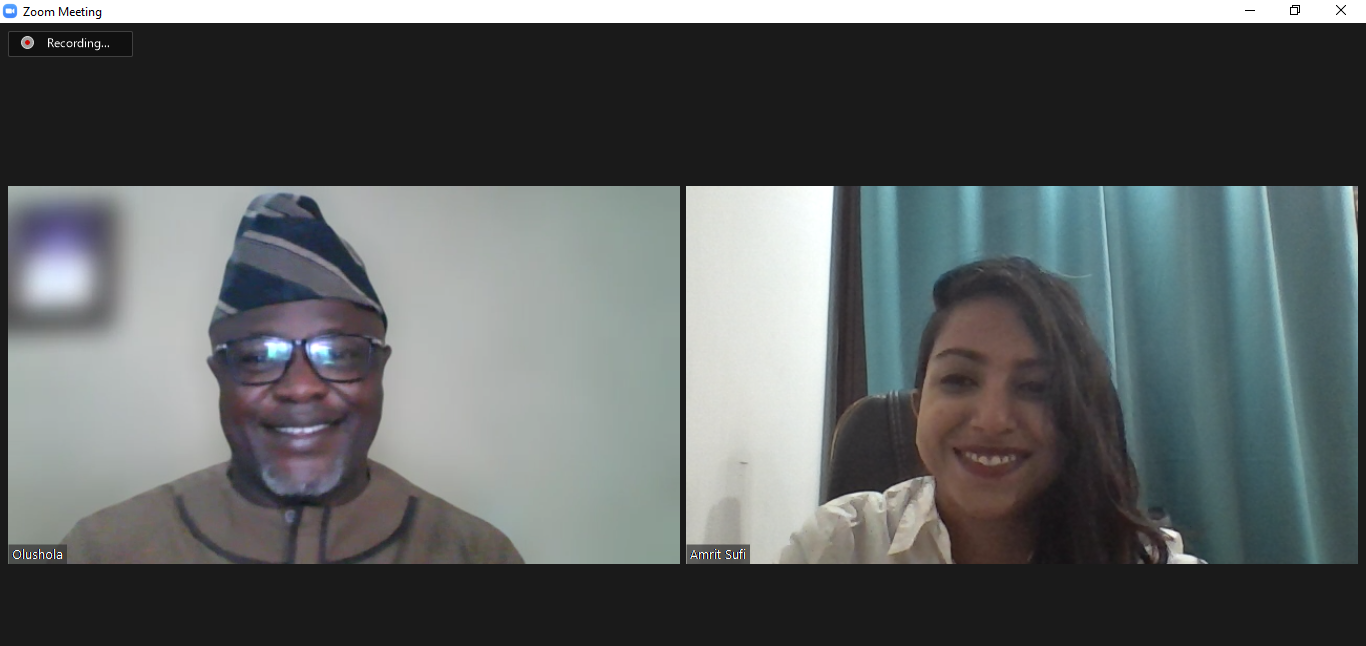
An online video conference interview

An online interview is an online research method conducted using computer-mediated communication (CMC), such as instant messaging, email, or video. Online interviews require different ethical considerations, sampling and rapport than practices found in traditional face-to-face (F2F) interviews. Online interviews are separated into synchronous online interviews, for example via online chat which happen in 'real time' online and asynchronous online interviews, for example via email conducted in non-real time. Some authors discuss online interviews in relation to online focus groups whereas others look at online interviews as separate research methods. This article will only discuss online interviews.

Online interviews, like offline interviews, typically ask respondents to explain what they think or how they feel about an aspect of their social world. Interviews are especially useful for understanding the meanings participants assign to their activities; their perspectives, motives, and experiences. Interviews are also useful for eliciting the language used by group members, gathering information about processes that cannot be observed, or inquiring about the past. Thus the objectives researchers have do not differ significantly, however the methods and research design can be effected by the online component of the research which this article will take issue with.

== Methodologies ==
In online interviews, data is primarily generated through conversations between a researcher and respondent. Researchers often seek out a deliberate (or "non-random") selection of respondents, recruiting individuals who can provide insight on a particular phenomenon, situation, or practice. Online Interviews can utilize a selection of formats and employ varying means of computer-mediated communication (CMC).

=== Synchronous ===
The interview is synchronous if it is conducted in real time. Skype interviews allow participants and researchers to converse in real time. Video chat is the closest a researcher will get towards resembling a face-to-face interview. This is because it allows for facial expressions and other visual cues that are absent in textually based forms such as chatrooms. Another way of conducting synchronous interviews online is using WebRTC. When WebRTC is used web browser (Firefox, Chrome or IE) acts as a client and both the parties can connect over a real-time video-chat.

=== Asynchronous ===
An asynchronous online interview takes place when the researcher and the participant are not online at the same time. Typically these interviews will use email but other technologies might also be employed. This can be an advantage for research conducted across time zones or with busy participants, allowing them to answer questions at their convenience. Kitvits (2005 cited in Dowling 2012) point out that asynchronous interviews are very useful for reflective process which helps to assure rigor.

A concern related to the asynchronous method is the possibility of interviews gradually drying up over an extended period. While the possibility of long term "longitudinal" research is valuable, it is also risky. Completion requires high levels of participant motivation, since they have not dedicated a specific block of time. Additionally, asynchronous online interviews may feel less conversational and make it more difficult to ask follow-up questions. Rezabek (2000) describes this as a "lack of timeliness".

=== Structured ===
Structured interviews are guided by questions which are prepared prior to the interview.

=== Semi-structured ===
Semi-structured interviews balance the pre-planned questions of a structured approach with the spontaneity and flexibility of the unstructured interview.

=== Unstructured ===
Unstructured interviews are conversations where the researcher collects data on a broad topic, however, does not have any specific questions prepared, allowing informants to guide the conversation by offering stories and additional insights. Unstructured interviews may be especially useful when researchers are trying to understand an unfamiliar setting, a phenomenon or people's motives. Dowling (2012) used unstructured interviews in an asynchronous format via email.

== Online versus offline ==
=== Advantages ===
There are many reasons online interviews can be an appropriate and valuable methodological tool. For example, the use of online interviews as opposed to onsite interviews provides the researcher with opportunities to:

- carry out interviews with a very geographically dispersed population.
- interview individuals or groups who are often difficult to reach, such as the less physically mobile (disabled/in prison/in hospital) or the socially isolated (drug dealers/terminally ill/ etc.) or those living in dangerous places (e.g. war zones).
- carry out interviews in a personal, yet neutral, location such as a home. Researchers and participants can be comfortable while still maintaining their personal space and, if necessary, keep their specific whereabouts private.
- reach a target audience where the audience is unknown (e.g. people who may use a certain type of technology) or would like to remain anonymous. E-mail and instant messaging interview methods have the advantage of privacy. Interviews that take place in public online venues (e.g. discussion boards, chatrooms) may be off-putting to some participants.
- provide savings in costs to the researcher (for example, costs associated with travel and venue hire).
- record data quickly and accurately. Video and audio interactions on Skype can be easily captured using desktop software. Data generated from textual forms (e.g. chatrooms, e-mail correspondence) is already transcribed.
- reduce the environmental impact of research by eliminating the resource expenditure associated with traveling long distances.
- interview individuals who would like to stay visual anonymous and to engage in more self-disclosure or feel liberated from stereotypes that may be associated with visible identity markers such as age, race or gender. Because the participant cannot see the researcher, this may also help reduce issues of interviewer effect.

In asynchronous interviews the extended time frame can also be a benefit allowing researchers more time to think of evocative or precise follow-up questions. Researchers can reread the chat history and use previous responses to inform the subsequent questions.

=== Limitations ===
There are, however, possible drawbacks to online interviews. Scholars such as Mann and Stewart (2005) have questioned how effective they are in comparison to face-to-face interviews. Online interviews may make it difficult to:

- establish a good rapport and level of trust between researcher and participant in a computer-mediated research relationship.
- achieve a long-term commitment to the research subject by participants, if this is necessary.
- communicate with participants with varying degrees of technical skill within a population. Participants cannot be assumed to all possess the level of technical competence required to employ the research methods.
- achieve satisfactory closure to the research relationship at the end of a long-term project.
- maintain attention, as the researcher may not have control over (or even be aware of) distractions that are interrupting the interviewee's engagement with the interview.
- recruit participants. In order to access specific populations, there may be a need to 'advertise' through relevant newsgroups and forums.

Though the question-and-answer format of the interview is similar to face-to-face interviews, during text-based interviews participants and researchers are not visible to one another. This can make it difficult to assess how questions and responses are being interpreted on either side due to a lack of visual cues.

Internet researcher Annette Markham (1998) observes that text-based interviewing can take much longer than face-to-face, phone or Skype interviews because typing takes longer than talking. Textual methods require users to verbalize conventional aspects of polite conversation, such as nodding or smiling, which requires added effort and time.

Others highlight the need for additional methodological planning for online interview respondents that includes the possibility that respondents may attempt to deliberately deceive

== Ethical considerations ==
There are many ethical considerations that arise solely because the interview is conducted online. As suggested by the Association of Internet Researchers (AoIR), these will vary depending on community norms, local and national codes and guidelines, and context specific considerations.

=== Privacy ===
If the research was conducted the researcher should consider taking appropriate steps to protect human subjects and, where appropriate, their avatars or online representations.

=== Consent ===
Has the researcher obtained proper informed consent? The importance of consent stays the same online. The researcher needs to obtain it so to not formally contravenes European data protection legislation. However, it can be done in different ways online. For example, a consent form could be emailed and then faxed, posted or send back via email. Another way of creating consent could be to include a tick box "I accept" to simulate a signature.

=== Withdrawal ===
In asynchronous formats of interviews, researchers have experienced a lack of knowing if the participant has withdrawn or if the answer just took some time. In synchronous interviews a withdraw button could be added.

=== Netiquette ===
Netiquette, the way people expect someone to behave online, becomes important for online interviews in three ways. Firstly, silence which can be used in face-to-face interviews as a tactic to encourage someone to talk more – is more ambiguous online. It could mean that the interviewer has left, is slow to answer or even withdrew from the interview. Secondly, by selecting participants for an online interview two things should be kept in mind. On the one side, the aspect of representation should be considered as not everyone has internet or has the technical abilities to use it. Furthermore, if the interviewer aims to approach candidates online in forums, the researcher should think of ways how to do it in the least disruptive way, for example asking the forum facilitator first instead of directly posting the inquiry into the forum. Another important aspect is the use of emoticons. A sensitive use of emoticons is advisable to adapt the style to suit that of the interviewee.

== Community interviews ==
The Internet allows many people at once to directly interview persons of public interest. Voting-systems may allow communities to collectively find the questions they'd like to get answered most.

=== Reddit AMAs ===
One popular subsite of the social media and aggregation site reddit, /r/IAmA, prompts its users to ask celebrities, politicians other persons of public interest questions about any topic. These interviews are called "AMAs" for "ask me anything". These interviews, of which there are multiple everyday, often receive thousands of questions which are voted on by the community via reddit's comment-voting system with all of them being answerable by the person being interviewed. Interviewees are required to provide proof of their identity to the volunteer moderators of the site and have included people such as Barack Obama, Chris Hadfield (who answered questions from the International Space Station), Bill Gates, Stephen Colbert, Arnold Schwarzenegger, Larry King and many more.
