= List mining =

List mining can be defined as the use, for purposes of scientific research, of messages sent to Internet-based electronic mailing lists. List mining raises novel issues in Internet research ethics. These ethical issues are especially important for health related lists. Some questions that need to be considered by a Research Ethics Committee (or an Institutional Review Board) when reviewing research proposals that involve list mining include these:

== Are participants in mailing lists "research subjects"? ==
Should those participants in a health related electronic mailing list who were the original sources of messages sent to such lists be regarded as "research subjects"? If so, then several ethical issues need to be considered. These include those pertaining to privacy, informed consent, whether the research is intrusive and has potential for harm, and whether the list should be perceived as "private" or "public" space.

== Are participants in mailing lists "published authors"? ==
Should those who were the sources of messages sent to such lists be regarded as "published authors"? Or, perhaps, as "amateur authors"? If so, there are issues of copyright and proper attribution to be considered if messages sent to such lists are cited verbatim. Even short excerpts from such messages raise such issues.

== Are participants in mailing lists "members of a community"? ==
Participants on mailing lists such as electronic support groups may regard themselves as members of an online "community". Are they?

To provide an answer to this question, characteristics of various types of communities need to be defined and considered. For example, if one defining characteristic of a community is "self-identification as community", then virtual groups often have this characteristic. However, if "geographic localization" or "legitimate political authority" are considered to be other defining characteristics of a community, then virtual groups rarely or never possess this characteristic.

Of particular importance are virtual groups that, instead of being supportive, may endanger public health in some way. Examples would be mailing lists that attempt to promote actions that may be illegal (such as inciting race hatred), or actions that may be unpopular, but not currently illegal (such as promoting the sale of cigarettes to adults). From a perspective of Internet research ethics, judgements about the potential of particular mailing lists to cause more harms than benefits should be made by a Research Ethics Committee (or an Institutional Review Board), rather than by the researchers themselves.

== See also ==
- Electronic mailing list
- Internet research ethics
