= Nancy Baym =

American academic

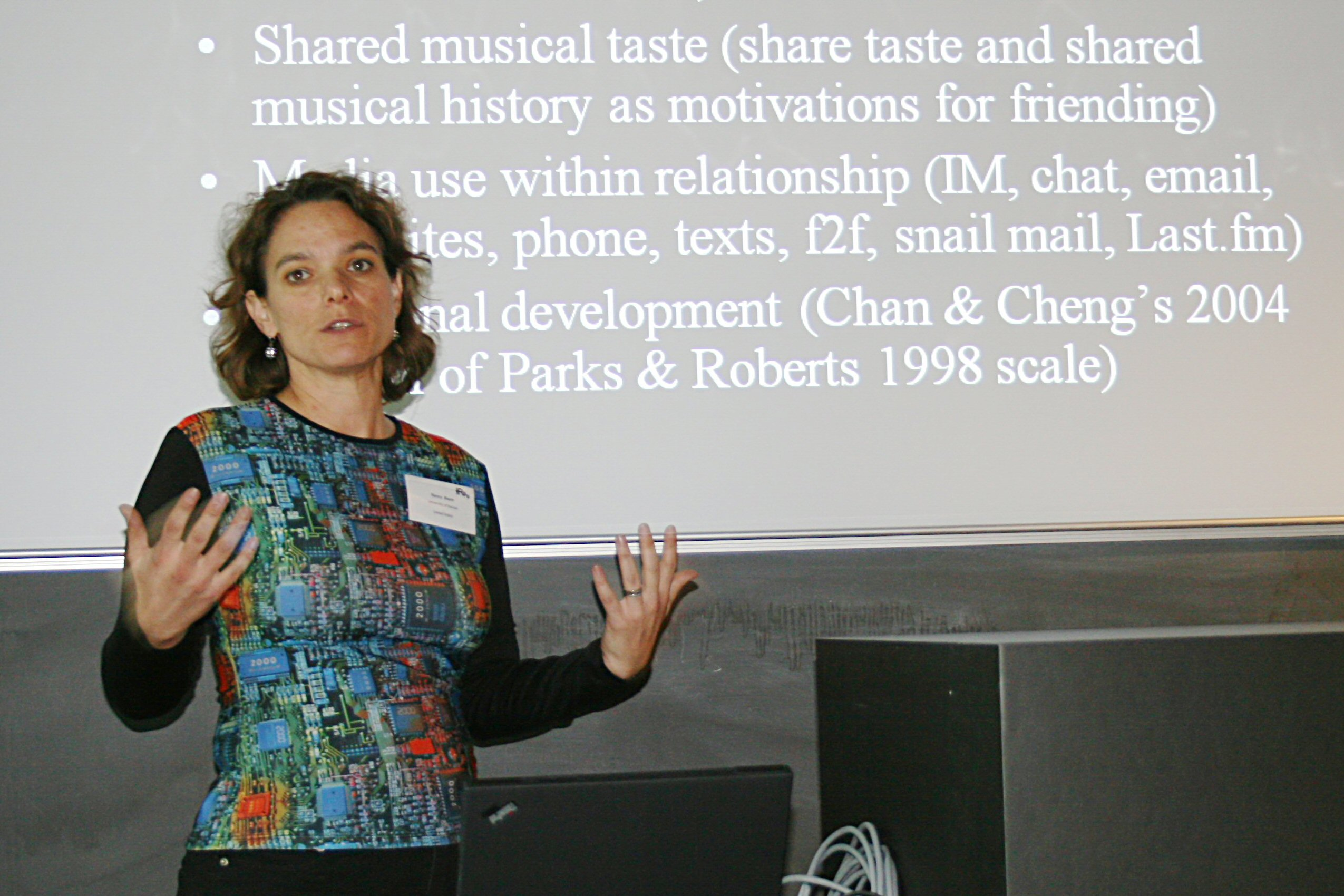
Nancy Baym at the AoIR Conference in Copenhagen in October 2008

Nancy Baym (born 1965) is an American scholar and senior principal research manager at Microsoft Research, formerly a professor of communication studies at the University of Kansas. She was a member of the founding board and former president of the Association of Internet Researchers, and serves on the board of several academic journals covering new media and communication. She has published research and provided media commentary on the topics of social communication, new media, and fandom.

== Education ==
- 1994, Ph.D., speech communication, University of Illinois at Urbana-Champaign.
- 1988, M.A., speech communication, University of Illinois at Urbana-Champaign.
- 1986, B.A., journalism and mass communication, University of Wisconsin-Madison.

== Career ==
Baym joined Microsoft Research in 2012, when Microsoft established a new group researching social media, with scholars including danah Boyd, Mary Gray and Kate Crawford in addition to Baym. Describing the new group, The Boston Globe wrote that the scholars were "trained in media studies and social sciences but had essentially become anthropologists of the digital age".

=== Academic appointments ===
- 2012–present, principal researcher, Microsoft Research.
- 2002–2012, professor, Department of Communication Studies, University of Kansas.
- 1999-2002, assistant professor, Department of Communication Studies, University of Kansas.
- 1994-1999, assistant professor, Department of Communication, Wayne State University.
- 1992-1994, visiting teaching associate in speech communication, University of Illinois at Urbana-Champaign.
- 1986-1992, teaching assistant in speech communication, University of Illinois at Urbana-Champaign.

== Publications ==
Baym has published several monographs, besides numerous articles.

In Tune In, Log On: Soaps, Fandom, and Online Community (2000), Baym argues that soap opera fans form "a dynamic community of people with unique voices, distinctive traditions, and enjoyable relationships."

Personal Connections in the Digital Age (2010), is about thinking critically about the roles of digital media in personal relationships, it offers data-grounded information on how to makes sense of these changes in relational life. She defines seven concepts "that can be used to differentiate digital media and which influence how people use them and with what effects." These concepts are interactivity, temporal structure, social cues, storage, replicability, reach and mobility. Ultimately, "the author states at the end that the book was written for those who see communication technologies as new and different, those who take them for granted and those who will be thinking through technologies not yet invented," claimed Stuart James Fitz-Gerald in his review of the book.

Playing to the Crowd: Musicians, Audiences, and the Intimate Work of Connection was published in 2018, and explores how digital technology has changed the relationship between musicians and their fans. When an excerpt was published in Wired, the book was described as showing "how music lovers used fan culture to build a worldwide web". The book was reviewed by scholarly journals both in media studies and musicology. One reviewer noted that while the book could have emphasised more diverse genres, such as hip hop, it was "a valuable resource for those trying to better understand relational labor conducted by artists". Perhaps in response to this criticism, Baym co-authored an article on hip-hop in 2022 with Jahari M. Evans.

== Awards ==
- Excellence in Teaching Award (College of Fine, Performing and Communication Arts, Wayne State University, 1997)
- W. T. Kemper Fellowship Teaching Excellence (Kansas University, 2005)

== Bibliography ==
- Baym, Nancy K. (2000), Tune In, Log On: Soaps, Fandom, and Online Community, Sage, ISBN 0-7619-1649-0
- Baym, Nancy K. (2006), "From Practice to Culture on Usenet", Handbook of New Media: Student Edition, pp. 29–32, ISBN 1-4129-1873-1
- Baym, Nancy K. (2006), "The Emergence of On-line Community", S. Jones (Ed.) Cybersociety: communication and community, Newbury Park, CA: Sage., pp. 35–68, ISBN 0-7619-1462-5
- Baym, Nancy K. (2010), Personal Connections in the Digital Age, Polity, ISBN 978-0-7456-4332-8
- Baym, Nancy K. (2018), Playing to the Crowd: Musicians, Audiences, and the Intimate Work of Connection, NYU Press, ISBN 9781479821587
- Burgess, Jean; Baym, Nancy K. (2020), Twitter: A Biography, NYU Press, ISBN 9781479811069
