= LiveAD =

- Industry: Communication, Advertising
- Founded: 2005
- Headquarters: São Paulo, Brazil
- Key people: Aline Rossin (CEO), Lucas Mello (Chairman)
- Website: live.tt

LiveAD is a digital agency based in Brazil, founded in 2005. The agency develops digital marketing, advertising and branded-content campaigns. The agency has worked with brands including Nike, PepsiCo, Red Bull, and Google.

== History ==
LiveAD was founded in Porto Alegre in 2005 when it split from the trends research agency Box1824, which was founded in 2003.

The agency's board of directors includes Lucas Mello (chairman) and Aline Rossin (CEO). Recently, PROFILE, a public relations agency that was hatched at LiveAD, was spun off. PROFILE is managed by founding partner Rodrigo Vieira da Cunha.

LiveAD has received awards at the 2009, 2010 and 2012 Cannes Lions International Festivals of Creativity, at the El Ojo de Iberoamérica festival in 2009 and 2010, and is the only Brazilian agency to have received an award at the 2012 Facebook Studio Awards and to be a finalist in the 2011 SXSW Interactive. Additionally, it was nominated for an award in the specialized services category in the 2012 Prêmio Caboré.

LiveAD's attend clients such as Nike, Ben & Jerry's, PepsiCo, Red Bull, Bodytech, Rider, Oi, and the UN Foundation. The agency has also worked with clients like Absolut Vodka, Claro, Doritos, Souza Barros, Skol, Zaxy, Google, C&A, Multishow, Lenovo, Lacoste, Itaú, Globo, Diageo and Antarctica, among others.
