= Focus group =

Group interviewed to analyse opinions

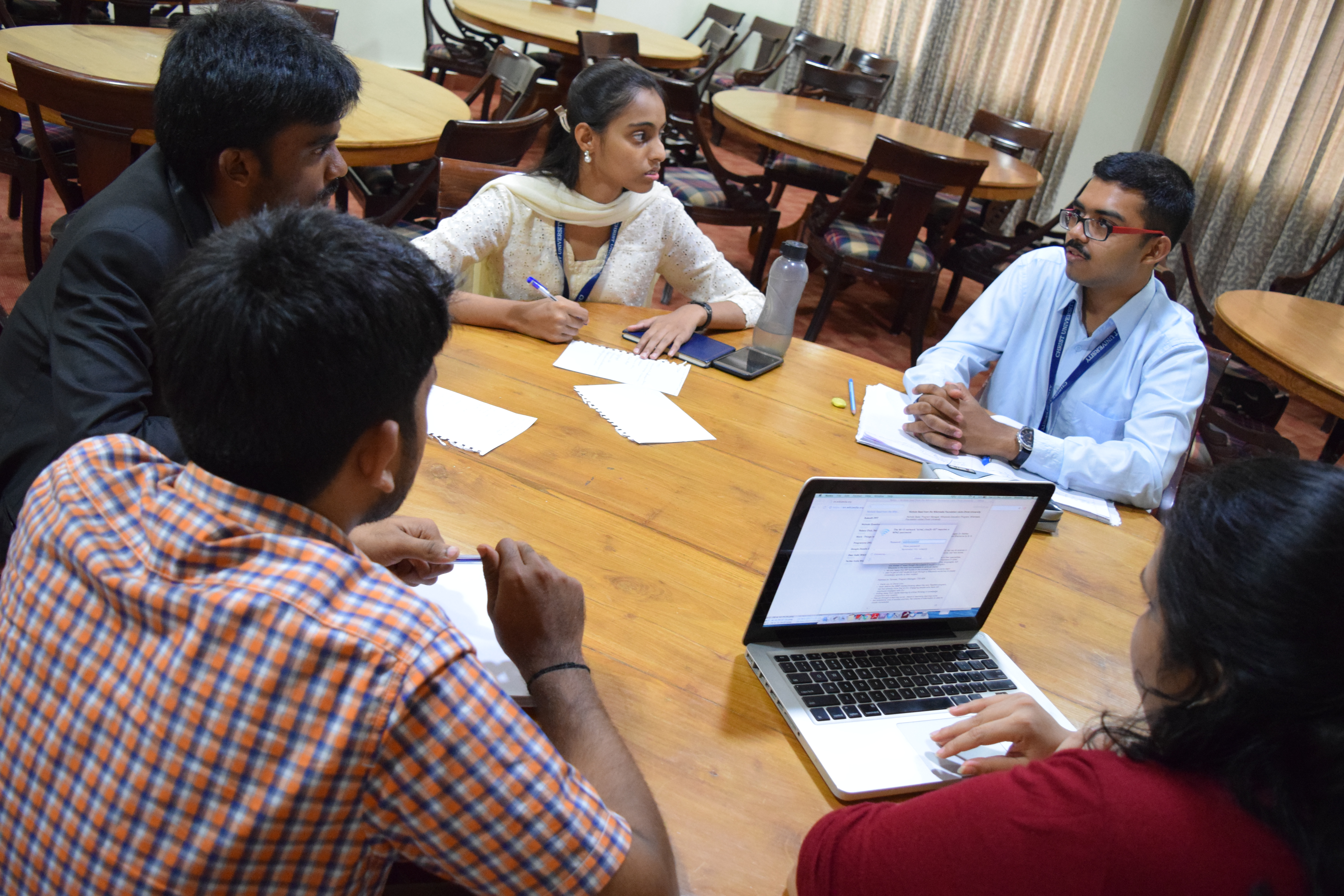
An in-person focus group in progress

A focus group is a group interview involving a small number (sometimes up to twelve) of demographically predefined participants. Their reactions to specific researcher/evaluator-posed questions are studied. Focus groups are used in market research to better understand people's reactions to products or services or participants' perceptions of shared experiences. The discussions can be guided or open. In market research, focus groups can explore a group's response to a new product or service. As a program evaluation tool, they can elicit lessons learned and recommendations for performance improvement. The idea is for the researcher to understand participants' reactions. If group members are representative of a larger population, those reactions may be expected to reflect the views of that larger population. Thus, focus groups constitute a research or evaluation method that researchers organize to collect qualitative data through interactive and directed discussions.

A focus group is also used by sociologists, psychologists, and researchers in communication studies, education, political science, and public health. Marketers can use the information collected from focus groups to obtain insights on a specific product, controversy, or topic. U.S. federal agencies, such as the Census Bureau for the 2020 decennial census, also use the focus group method for message testing purpose among diverse populations.

Used in qualitative research, the interviews involve a group of people who are asked about their perceptions, attitudes, opinions, beliefs, and views regarding many different topics (e.g., abortion, political candidates or issues, a shared event, needs assessment). Group members are often free to talk and interact with each other. Instead of a researcher/evaluator asking group members questions individually, focus groups use group interaction to explore and clarify participants' beliefs, opinions, and views. The interactivity of focus groups allows researchers to obtain qualitative data from multiple participants, often making focus groups a relatively expedient, convenient, and efficacious research method. While the focus group is taking place, the facilitator either takes notes and/or records the discussion for later note-taking in order to learn from the group. Researchers/evaluators should select members of the focus group carefully in order to obtain useful information. Focus groups may also include an observer who pays attention to dynamics not expressed in words e.g., body language, people who appear to have something to add but do not speak up.

== History ==
Focus groups first started in the 1940s as a research method in the context of market research concerning radio soap operas. During the Second World War, Robert K. Merton set out to analyze the effectiveness of propaganda with the use of focus groups. Merton devised a procedure in which twelve participants at a radio studio would respond to negatively associated content by hitting a red button or positively associated information by hitting a green button. From there, Merton created an interviewing procedure to gain further insight into the subjective reactions of focus-group participants. He later established focus groups for the Bureau of Applied Social Research. Paul Lazarsfeld had also received a government contract to use group interviews to get insight into individuals' responses to war radio propaganda.

From the late 1950s onward, innovators including Saul Ben-Zeev of Creative Research Associates nurtured the form from its infancy, and helped carry the method from academic settings into corporate decision making. Ben-Zeev drew on his expertise in group dynamics, employing an unstructured style of questioning to allow conversations to flow freely to unexpected places, which in turn led to deeper insights, and novel marketing strategies. He argued that observing real people interact, challenge one another, debate, and reconsider their thoughts in real time yielded far more reliable, actionable business insights than trying to decode a consumer's subconscious motivations. In recognition of Ben-Zeev's contribution, Global Focus Group Day is commemorated on July 9th, the anniversary of his birth.

As for the term "focus group" itself, Psychologist and marketing expert Ernest Dichter is believed to have coined the term in the 1950s.

== Use in disciplines ==
=== Library and information science ===
In disciplines of library and information science, when librarians intend to work on a library's collection, they consult patrons. The focus groups librarians organize are helpful in identifying patrons' needs. In addition, teachers, other professionals, and researchers can also be recruited to participate in focus groups to ascertain those individuals' library-related needs. Focus groups can also help librarians better understand patron behavior and the impact of services on the library use.

=== Social sciences ===
In the social sciences and in urban planning, focus groups allow interviewers to study people in a more natural conversational pattern than typically occurs in a one-to-one interview. In combination with participant observation, focus groups can be used for learning about group attitudes and patterns of interaction. An advantage of focus groups is their fairly low cost compared to surveys because focus groups allow a researcher to obtain results relatively quickly and increase the sample size by including several people at once. Another advantage is that a focus group can allow participants to learn from one another as they exchange views and to understand research as an enriching experience. The nature of the focus group contrasts with the more typically extractive nature of traditional social science research which seeks to "mine" participants for data (with few benefits for participants); this difference is especially important for indigenous researchers who employ focus groups to conduct research on their own ethnic group.

=== Marketing ===
In marketing, focus groups are seen as an important tool for acquiring feedback regarding new products and other marketing-related topics. Focus groups are usually employed in the early stages of product or concept development, when organizations are trying to determine the overall direction of a marketing initiative. Participants are recruited on the basis of their similarity to members of the demographic groups targeted as potential consumers of the product. Focus groups allow companies wishing to develop, package, name, or test market a new product to get the perspective of potential consumers before the product is made available to the public. Focus groups can thus provide valuable information about the potential for consumer acceptance of the product.

The focus group interview is conducted informally and as naturally as possible. Participants are free to give views about any aspect of the product. These focus groups should not be confused with in-depth interviews. The moderator uses a discussion guide that has been prepared in advance of the focus group to maintain the discussion on course. Generally, the discussion moves from overall impressions of a brand or product category and becomes more specific as the discussion progresses. Stakeholders such as members of a design team are not involved in the focus group, to avoid potential bias. However, they may attend the focus group, either through video cameras or by watching through a one-way mirror.

Focus groups can provide accurate information and are less expensive than other forms of marketing research. However, there can be significant costs. For example, if a product is to be marketed on a nationwide basis, it would be helpful to conduct focus groups in various localities because the desirability of a new product may vary from place to place. Conducting focus groups in different areas of the country would require considerable expenditure on travel and lodging for moderators.

=== Usability engineering ===
In usability engineering, a focus group can be used to collect the feedback of software or website users. Focus groups can be applied to computer products to better understand the motivations of users and their perceptions of the product.

=== Cross-cultural research ===
The focus group method is developed based on white, middle-class, and adult American participants. When applied to cross-cultural settings, cultural and linguistic adaptations are important for the research to succeed; cultural sensitivity is critically important. For example, in some Asian languages, open-ended probes and nonverbal communication can encourage greater participation in the group discussion. In some non-Western cultures, a younger person does not openly disagree with an older individual; focus group composition, therefore, must be carefully considered when designing the research plan.

== Types ==
Variants of focus groups include:

- Two-way focus group - one focus group watches another focus group and discusses the observed interactions and conclusion
- Dual moderator focus group - one moderator ensures the session progresses smoothly, while another ensures that all the topics are covered
- Dueling moderator focus group (fencing-moderator) - two moderators deliberately take opposite sides on the issue under discussion
- Respondent moderator focus group - one and only one of the respondents is asked to act as the moderator temporarily
- Client participant focus groups - one or more client representatives participate in the discussion, either covertly or overtly
- Mini focus groups - groups are composed of four or five members rather than 6 to 12
- Teleconference focus groups - telephone network is used
- Creativity groups
- Band obsessive group
- Online focus groups - computers connected via the internet are used
- Phone/ web focus groups - live group conducted over the phone and online with 6 to 8 participants.

=== General guidelines on how to conduct focus-group discussions ===
When conducting a focus-group discussion where the topic being discussed is of a sensitive nature, it is recommended that the participants be of the same sex, age-range, and socio-economic background. It is also desirable that the participants do not know each other prior to the discussion.

Informed consent must be granted before beginning the discussion. In addition, before the discussion is to begin potential group members should be briefed about the topic of discussion and informed about their rights, including the confidentiality (e.g., that their identities will not be revealed in any report or publication).

Important considerations are the homogeneity of the group members, settings, and the nature of open-ended questions, which are hoped to encourage the members to talk more freely. The discussion must be held in a relaxed setting, with the entire session recorded (audio or visual). There should also be a note-taker who writes down all important aspects of the discussion, but who is not a part of the discussion. This note-taker must have in-depth knowledge about the topic at hand, should be trained in observing verbal and non-verbal feedback (for example, noting facial expressions), and whose duty is to translate the notes taken during session into data for analysis.

Areas of interest to be discussed during the session need to be specified by the moderators and organizers prior to the session. The moderator makes sure that all these areas are covered during the discussion. The moderator introduces new topics, directs the conversation and encourages participation while trying to minimize bias.

The moderator should create an environment that encourages members to share their views, while keeping track of the discussion and preventing it from drifting from the topic at hand. Because the participants often do not know each other, the moderator must ensure that everyone feels comfortable and there is good rapport. The purpose and format of the discussion should be made clear at the beginning of the session. All participants should be encouraged to participate, share their views, and be told that divergent views are welcome.

Flick writes that a formal explanation of the procedure should be given to the participants. Expectation-setting is an essential component in this step. Expectations can include being involved in the discussion, arguing about certain topics, and collective problem-solving. Introducing the members to one another and having a "warm up" can help prepare the participants for the discussion. The moderator must establish common ground for the participants in order to facilitate community feeling. The actual discussion takes place following "discussion stimuli," which may be in the form of a provocative thesis, a short film, lecture on a text, or unfolding of a concrete problem for which a solution needs to be found.

The questions should be open ended. However, there should be a smooth transition from one question to the next. The session should ideally start with introductory questions to address the general topic, helping the participants to understand the broader context. The general questions should be followed by questions designed to elicit the specific information sought. The focus group should end with efforts to summarize the opinions of the participants.

== Online focus groups ==
Focus groups typically are conducted face-to-face, but the development of new technologies has enabled investigators to conduct qualitative research online. Two types of online methods, synchronous and asynchronous, have emerged. Synchronous methods allow researchers to conduct live discussions. Synchronous online discussions attempt to mimic in-person focus groups. Barriers to the success of synchronous online focus groups include the problem of arriving at a convenient time for all participants and lack of accessibility for some participants.

Asynchronous methods collect participant information through online communication such as forums and email lists. Asynchronous online focus groups have a number barriers to success. These barriers include sporadic participation over time, making the research less timely. The benefits of online both synchronous and asynchronous focus groups include the absence of a need for transportation and ease of access.

A major advantage of online focus groups is that they allow geographically diverse individuals to participate. A disadvantage is a reduced capacity to assess non-verbal behavior; assessing non-verbal behavior can be helpful to qualitative researchers.

== Discussions ==
- Group discussion can produce data and insights that would be less accessible without the interaction found in a group setting. The idea is that listening to one individual's description of his or her experiences stimulates ideas and memories of experiences in fellow participants. This process is also known as the group effect; group members engage in "a kind of 'chaining' or 'cascading' effect; talk links to, or tumbles out of, the topics and expressions preceding it" (Lindlof & Taylor, 2002, p. 182)
- Group members discover a common language to describe similar experiences. This enables the capture of a form of "native language" or "vernacular speech" to understand the situation
- Focus groups also provide an opportunity for disclosure among similar others in a setting where participants are validated. For example, in the context of workplace bullying, targeted employees often find themselves in situations where they experience a lack of voice and feelings of isolation. Use of focus groups to study workplace bullying, therefore, serves as both an efficacious and ethical venue for collecting such data (see, e.g., Tracy, Lutgen-Sandvik, & Alberts, 2006) Of course, collecting data on workplace bullying requires the research team to protect the members of the group and put an end to the bullying.
- The interactive, discussion-based context of focus groups can illustrate how meanings are produced intersubjectively. Meaning production is naturally a socially shared process, making focus groups a useful method for researching the attitudes, experiences, and understandings of individuals and groups.

== Advantages of focus groups ==
Focus groups have several advantages for collecting qualitative research data. Focus group research can be used purely as a qualitative method or in combination with quantitative methods. Qualitative data collected in focus groups can help researchers decide what kinds of items to include in surveys. The moderator can inquire into and examine unforeseen issues with that arise in the context of the discussion. The format has a kind of face-validity and is naturalistic in that the discussion can include storytelling, joking, disagreements, and boasting. Running focus groups is straightforward and relatively inexpensive. Focus groups ordinarily consume less time than structured interviews, thus increasing sample sizes, lessening resource investment, and providing fast results. Focus groups tend to be more efficient when the data being gathered are related to the researcher's interests. They are helpful and important for needs assessments and project evaluations. A focus group discussion can create a synergy that can provide information that can't be gained in other ways. Vocabulary can be observed. New, insightful perspectives and opinions are obtained. Sensitive topics can be discussed, leading to personal disclosures. The moderator maintains the discussion and makes sure no one individual can dominate the group, thus creating a more "egalitarian" context. Non-verbal behavior plays a role in the moderator's decision-making and research results, increasing the chances of obtaining rich, in-depth information. Previously neglected or unnoticed phenomena can be brought to the researcher's attention.

== Problems ==
Although the focus-group method of data collection has several advantages, the method also has limitations. The focus group method provides little experimental control. Data collected are usually difficult to analyze. The discussion must be audio or videotaped, field notes have to be recorded, and comments must be transcribed verbatim, increasing the risk of error. The method requires carefully trained interviewers. Groups may vary considerably and investigators may have difficulty assembling the appropriate group. Discussion must be conducted in an environment that is conducive to conversation. There is also the potential for discussion facilitators to ask leading questions that produce biased results. The ability of the leader to facilitate the discussion may be critical, as the group largely relies on the assisted discussion in order to produce results. Thus, there is the need for skilled group leaders. There is a risk that a leader could dominate or 'hijack' the discussion. Results obtained may be biased, when one or two participants dominate the discussion. The representativeness of the sample is likely to be a concern. Generalizing knowledge learned about the sample may not generalize to population because participants are self-selected. The moderator may influence the group interactions, thus distorting results or findings. The participants' involvement in, and contribution to, the discussion plays a major role. Problems may arise if topics are controversial in nature, leading to disagreements and arguments. Dealing with sensitive topics is a challenge. A contrived or artificial environment may influence the interactions, and thus bias responses. Ethical issues may arise regarding confidentiality. Psychometric validity may be low.

A fundamental difficulty with focus groups (and other forms of qualitative research) is the issue of observer dependency: the results obtained are influenced by the researcher or his or her reading of the group's discussion, thus raising questions of the validity of the research (see experimenter's bias). Focus groups are "One-shot case studies" especially if they are measuring a property-disposition relationship within the social sciences, unless they are repeated. Focus groups can create severe issues of external validity, especially the reactive effects of the testing arrangement. Other common (and related) criticism involve groupthink and social desirability bias.

Another problem is with the setting of the focus group. If a focus group is held in a laboratory setting with a moderator who is a professor and the recording instrument is obtrusive, the participants may either hold back on their responses and/or try to answer the moderator's questions with answers the participants feel that the moderator wants to hear. Another problem with the focus group setting is the lack of anonymity. With multiple participants, confidentiality cannot be assured.

Douglas Rushkoff argued that focus groups are often useless and frequently create more problems than the problems the groups are intended to solve. Because focus groups often aim to please their underwriters rather than provide independent opinions or evaluations, the data are sometimes cherry picked to support a foregone conclusion. Rushkoff cited the disastrous introduction of New Coke in the 1980s as an example of focus group design, implementation, and analysis gone bad.

Jonathan Ive, Apple's senior vice president of industrial design, noted that Apple had found a good reason not to employ focus groups. He said that "They just ensure that you don't offend anyone, and produce bland inoffensive products."

== Data analysis ==
The analysis of focus group data presents both challenges and opportunities when compared to other types of qualitative data. Some authors have suggested that data should be analyzed in the same manner as interview data, while others have suggested that the unique features of focus group data – particularly the opportunity that it provides to observe interactions between group members - means that distinctive forms of analysis should be used. Data analysis can take place at the level of the individual or the group.

Focus group data provides the opportunity to analyze the strength with which an individual holds an opinion. If they are presented with opposing opinions or directly challenged, the individual may either modify their position or defend it. Bringing together all the comments that an individual makes in order can enable the researcher to determine whether their view changes in the course of discussion and, if so, further examination of the transcript may reveal which contributions by other focus group members brought about the change.

At the collective level, focus group data can sometimes reveal shared understandings or common views. However, there is a danger that a consensus can be assumed when not every person has spoken: the researcher will need to consider carefully whether the people who have not expressed a view agree with the majority or whether they may simply be unwilling to voice their disagreement.

Many computer programs are available to help in analyzing qualitative data. The capacity of computers to effectively sort, store, and retrieve information makes their use in qualitative data analysis appealing. However, it is important to be aware that computers can only aid in some parts of the analysis of qualitative data; computer software does not code data nor can replace conceptual analysis. It cannot analyze qualitative data for the researcher.

== Exercises ==
Various creative activity-oriented questions can serve as supplements to verbal questions including but not limited to the following:

- Free listings – participants produce a list of all elements of a domain
- Rating – participants have a list of items which must be rated on a scale, typically using numbers or adjectives
- Ranking – participants can either receive a list of items to rank according to a specified dimension or participants can combine items in pairs to compare elements in the pairs
- Pile sorting – participants sort cards representing elements of a domain into piles according to their similarities and differences
- Picture sort – Participants are distributed selected pictures from magazines or photographs to sort through, finding matches of a definite characteristic or that best represent a certain category
- Magic tools and fantasy – the moderator can literally or symbolically pass around a "magical" tool to each participant as he or she shares a fantasy, dream, or idea
- Storytelling – participants create a narrative around the topic of interest to make others think about a solution to a problem, gauge reactions to a situation, and observe attitudes towards the topic under study
- Role-playing – participants demonstrate through action how they would behave or act in a situation, how they would solve a problem, or deal with a difficulty
- Sentence completion – participants are given printed out partial sentences on a topic to complete and share within a group
- Collage – a moderator assigns a theme and then distributes print materials to participants (who are divided into small groups), so they can use these materials, drawings, and their own words to create a relevant collage.

== See also ==
- Coolhunting
- Crowd manipulation
- Customer advisory council
- Enterprise Feedback Management (EFM)
- Innovation game
- Nominal group technique
- Spin (public relations)
- Usability engineering
- Washington County Closed-Circuit Educational Television Project
