= Online research community =

An online research community (part of Research 2.0) is a part of an emerging and developing area in market research making use of developments in Web 2.0 technologies and online communities. They allow qualitative research to be conducted efficiently and deeply online.

Both public and private online communities offer opportunities for research, but many brands are wary of sharing company information openly. Invitation-only, private online communities centred on a single brand or customer segment may be the solution. These private communities can also engage customer groups or target consumers who might be difficult to reach using traditional off-line methodologies. Consumers enjoy this new, more participative research approach and the interaction with other users re-introduces the social context often missing from other research approaches that conceive of the consumer as an isolated individual.

There are a number of research applications for online communities. They can be used to answer questions, test hypotheses, and collect observational feedback. The format can be adapted to a range of research needs, for example, providing creative stimulus material, generating ideas for innovation and co-creation or doing quick “go/no-go” assessments. Because these communities exist over time, they can support ongoing ideation processes that run in parallel with internal development timelines and provide a feedback loop that informs product development from inception to launch.

In an online research community members (rather than respondents) talk to each other – they exchange ideas and discuss issues with each other. Unlike a panel this lets researchers observe how people interact, the language they use, and lets them raise the questions they want to ask, which results in richer responses.

== See also ==
- Community of practice
- Internet forum
- Internet mediated research
- Market research
- Online deliberation
- Online community manager
- Qualitative research
- Social network
- Social network service
- Social media
