= Online focus group =

An online focus group is one type of focus group, and is a sub-set of online research methods. They are typically an appropriate research method for consumer research, business-to-business research and political research.

== Typical operation ==
A moderator invites pre-screened, qualified respondents who represent the target of interest to log on to conferencing software at a pre-arranged time and to take part in an online focus group. It is common for respondents to receive an incentive for participating. Discussions generally last one hour to 90 minutes. The moderator guides the discussion using a combination of predetermined questions and unscripted probes. In the best discussions, as with face to face groups, respondents interact with each other as well as the moderator in real time to generate deeper insights about the topic.

== Appropriateness as a research method and advantages ==
Online focus groups are appropriate for consumer research, business to business research and political research. Interacting over the web avoids a significant amount of travel expense. It allows respondents from all over the world to gather, electronically for a more representative sample. Often respondents open up more online than they would in person, which is valuable for sensitive subjects. Like in-person focus groups, online groups are usually limited to 8-10 participants. 'Whiteboard' exercises and the ability to mark up concepts or other visual stimuli simulate many of the characteristics of in-person groups.

In addition to the savings on travel, online focus groups often can be accomplished faster than traditional groups because respondents are recruited from online panel members who are often qualified to match research criteria.

== Software options ==
There are a variety of software options, most of which offer similar features but can vary significantly in price. It is important to choose your software carefully, ensuring that it is easy enough to use by both you as a researcher and your participants. Of course, you should also choose a software that will meet your research needs effectively. Software is just one aspect of online groups, just as facilities are just one aspect of face to face groups. As with in-person groups, the skill of the moderator, the quality of the recruiting and the ability to tie the results to research objectives and business decisions is critical to the value of the research to the client.

A new emerging type of online focus group is one where there are only single participants, with no moderator (unmoderated online focus groups). A system invites prescreened, qualified respondents to participate on a "first come, first served" basis, and to conduct a task or series of tasks such as interacting with a website or website prototype, reacting to an online ad or concept, viewing videos, commercials (whether for TV or online production), etc., while at their home or workplace. While the participant is conducting the assigned task, his or her own webcam is recording their face, and at the same time, every action taking place on the screen is being recorded. After the task is completed the participant is asked to answer a series of post task survey questions such as "What was the message being conveyed by that ad? Why did you stop viewing that video? Why were you unable to complete the goal?" etc.

The results are composited into a 360° Video in Video (ViV), such that a synchronized recording of the desktop, both browser and non browser related, is played (what the participants did), synchronized with a web cam recording of the participant in their home or workplace (what the participant said, who they are, and what is their context) playing simultaneously.

The first recorded online focus group was led by Bruce Hall (President, Eureka! Inventing) and Doug Brownstone (Rutgers University), both marketers at Novartis Consumer Health at the time based in Summit, New Jersey. While at a conference in Scottsdale, Arizona in June, 1995 they led an online focus group on the Perdiem laxative brand which included ten women recruited from the brand's customer database. While the online tools were primitive at the time it was deemed to be valuable in collecting consumer insights.

This service was first brought to market by www.userlytics.com, and initially focused on the website usability and user experience field. However, its uses have since expanded to hosted prototype testing, ad and campaign optimization prior to multivariate testing, understanding analytics results, desktop and enterprise user interface (UI) testing, and software as a service (SaaS) testing.

== Patent Information ==
U.S. Patent No. 6,256,663 is summarized as 'System and Method For Conducting Focus Groups Using Remotely Located Participants Over A Computer Network.' and was filed on January 22, 1999 by Greenfield Online, Inc.

The market research technology provider Itracks (Interactive Tracking Systems Inc.) later acquired the patent in 2001 from Greenfield Online.

== See also ==
- Online interviews
