= Open access citation advantage =

Tendency of scholars to cite journals with open access

Open access citation advantage (OACA) is a type of bias whereby scholars tend to cite academic journals with open access (OA)—that is, journals that make their full text available on the Internet without charge and not behind a paywall—in preference to toll-access publications. The concept was introduced under the name FUTON bias ("full text on the net") by UK medical researcher Reinhard Wentz in a letter to The Lancet in 2002.

Scholars in some fields can more easily discover and access articles whose full text is available online, which increases authors' likelihood of reading and citing these articles, an issue that was first raised and has been mainly studied in connection with medical research. In the context of evidence-based medicine, articles in expensive journals that do not provide open access may be "priced out of evidence", giving a greater weight to open access publications. Open access citation advantage may increase the impact factor of open access journals relative to journals without open access.

One study concluded that authors in medical fields "concentrate on research published in journals that are available as full text on the internet, and ignore relevant studies that are not available in full text, thus introducing an element of bias into their search result". Authors of another study conclude that "the OA advantage is a quality advantage, rather than a quality bias", that authors make a "self-selection toward using and citing the more citable articles—once OA self-archiving has made them accessible", and that open access "itself will not make an unusable (hence uncitable) paper more used and cited".

A similar phenomenon, termed the "no abstract available bias" or NAA bias, is a scholar's tendency to cite journal articles that have an abstract available online more readily than articles that do not—this affects articles' citation count similarly to open access citation advantage.

== See also ==
- Digital divide
- #ICanHazPDF
- Sci-Hub
