= Internet research ethics =

Internet research ethics involves the research ethics of social science, humanities, and scientific research carried out via the Internet.

Of particular interest is the example of English Wikipedia and research ethics. The usual view is that private and public spaces become blurred on the Internet. There are a number of objections to this stance, which are all relevant to English Wikipedia research. In particular, it can be difficult for researchers to ensure participant anonymity. One study of 112 published educational technology research papers was able to identify participant identities in 10 of those papers; the majority of these studies had gathered this data under conditions of anonymity.

An assessment of ethics in Internet-based research, together with some recommendations, has been prepared by a Working Committee of the Interagency Advisory Panel on Research Ethics (PRE)in Canada. PRE is a body of external experts established in November 2001 by three Canadian Research Agencies—the Canadian Institutes of Health Research (CIHR), the Natural Sciences and Engineering Research Council (NSERC) and the Social Sciences and Humanities Research Council (SSHRC) -- to support the development and evolution of their joint research ethics policy the Tri-Council Policy Statement: Ethical Conduct for Research Involving Humans (TCPS).

== See also ==
- List mining
