= Internet-mediated research =

Internet-mediated research (IMR) is the research conducted through the medium of the Internet. In the medical field, it pertains to the practice of gathering medical, biomedical or health related research data via the internet directly from research subjects. The subject, uses a web browser to view and respond to questionnaires that are included in an approved medical research protocol. Other fields such as geography also use IMR as a research tool.

The primary Internet-mediated research is classified into three main types: online questionnaires, virtual interviews, and virtual ethnographies. There is also the case of secondary Internet research, which involves the use of the Internet in the location of secondary information sources such as journal databases, newspapers, and digital archives, among others. Some sources, however, exclude this type in their conceptualization of IMR.

In a traditional medical research study, the principal investigator, Research Coordinator, or other study staff conducts an interview with the research subject and records the information on a paper or electronic case report form. Using IMR, the research subject instead responds to a questionnaire without the guidance of a research staff member, often performing the action at a time and place disassociated with the research clinic, using only a computer connected to the internet and a standard browser.

Recently, the medical community has begun to study whether there are differences between IMR data and traditionally collected data.
