= Internet studies =

Study of the Internet's effects on society

Internet studies is an interdisciplinary field studying the social, psychological, political, technical, cultural and other dimensions of the Internet and associated information and communication technologies. The human aspects of the Internet are a subject of focus in this field. While that may be facilitated by the underlying technology of the Internet, the focus of study is often less on the technology itself than on the social circumstances that technology creates or influences.

While studies of the Internet are now widespread across academic disciplines, there is a growing collaboration among these investigations. In recent years, Internet studies have become institutionalized as courses of study at several institutions of higher learning. Cognates are found in departments of a number of other names, including departments of "Internet and Society", "virtual society", "digital culture", "new media" or "convergent media", various "iSchools", or programs like "Media in Transition" at MIT. On the research side, Internet studies intersects with studies of cyberculture, human–computer interaction, and science and technology studies. Internet and society is a research field that addresses the interrelationship of Internet and society, i.e. how society has changed the Internet and how the Internet has changed society.

The topic of social issues relating to Internet has become notable since the rise of the World Wide Web, which can be observed from the fact that journals and newspapers run many stories on topics such as cyberlove, cyberhate, Web 2.0, cybercrime, cyberpolitics, Internet economy, etc. As most of the scientific monographs that have considered Internet and society in their book titles are social theoretical in nature, Internet and society can be considered as a primarily social theoretical research approach of Internet studies.

== Topics of study ==
In recent years, Internet studies have become institutionalized as courses of study, and even separate departments, at many institutions of higher learning.

Disciplines that contribute to Internet studies include:

- Computer-mediated communication (CMC): such as the role of e-mail, social media, MMORPGs, online chat, blogs, and text messaging in communication processes.
- Digital rights: including privacy, free speech, intellectual property, and digital rights management.
- Digital labor and the "gig economy".
- Internet architecture: including the fundamental programming and architecture of the Internet, such as TCP/IP, HTML, CSS, CGI, CFML, DOM, JS, PHP, XML.
- Internet culture: including the emergence of Internet slang, cyberculture and digital music.
- Internet linguistics: the study of language on the Internet, including slang.
- Internet security: such as the structure and propagation of viruses, malware, and software exploits, as well as methods of protection, including antivirus programs and firewalls.
- Online communities: including Internet forums, blogs, and MMORPGs.
- Open source software: focusing on the ability of Internet users to collaborate to modify, develop, and improve pieces of software which are freely available to the public without charge.
- Sociology of the Internet: including the social implications of the Internet, new social networks, online societies (virtual communities), identity practices and social interaction on the Internet.
- Science and technology studies: how and why we have the digital technologies we have, and how society shapes their development.
- Internet and social media use in politics: including its use for mobilizing political campaigns and protests.
- Web archiving and the history of the Internet: preservation of the objects of study, and focusing on the development of the Internet over time.
- Digital Rhetoric: research related to how traditional rhetoric functions in a digital environment, and how the digital medium has to change and adapt those traditions, as well as develop new rhetorical theories.

== Key journals ==
A number of academic journals are central to communicating research in the field, including Bad Subjects, Convergence, CTheory, Cyber Psychology & Behaviour, Computers in Human Behavior, First Monday, Information, Communication & Society, The Information Society, Journal of Computer-Mediated Communication, M/C Journal, New Media & Society, Social Science Computer Review, tripleC, Fibreculture Journal, and TeknoKultura. However, research relating to internet studies appears in a diverse range of venues and disciplines.

== History ==
Barry Wellman argues that Internet studies may find its beginnings with the 1978 publication of The Network Nation, and was largely dominated by computer scientists, presenting at venues like the annual CSCW conference. These were quickly joined by researchers in business fields and library and information science. By the late 1990s, more attention was being paid to systematic investigation of users and how they made use of the new technologies.

During the 1990s, the rapid diffusion of Internet access began to attract more attention from a number of social science and humanities disciplines, including the field of communication. Some of these investigations, like the Pew Internet & American Life project and the World Internet Project framed the research in terms of traditional social science approaches, with a focus less on the technology than on those who use them. But the focus remained at the aggregate level. In the UK, the ESRC Programme on Information and Communications Technologies (1986–1996) laid considerable ground work on how society and ICTs interact, bringing together important clusters of scholars from media and communications, society, innovation, law, policy and industry across leading UK universities.

In 1996, this interest was expressed in other ways as well. Georgetown University began offering a related master's program in that year, and at the University of Maryland, David Silver created the Resource Center for Cyberculture Studies on the web. Middlebury College developed Politics of Virtual Realities, one of the first undergraduate courses dedicated to exploring the political, legal and normative implications of the Internet for liberal democracy. By 2001, The Chronicle of Higher Education noted that "Internet studies" was emerging as a discipline in its own right, as suggested by the first undergraduate program in the area, offered at Brandeis University, and noted that "perhaps the most telling sign of the field's momentum" was the popularity of the annual conference created by the then nascent Association of Internet Researchers.

== Scholarly organizations ==
- American Society for Information Science and Technology (ASIST)
- American Sociological Association, Section on Communication and Information Technologies (CITASA)
- Association of Internet Researchers (AoIR)
- Association for Education in Journalism and Mass Communication, Communication & Technology Division (CTEC)
- Association for Computing Machinery (ACM)
- European Association for the Study of Science and Technology (EASST)
- European Consortium for Political Research (ECPR) Internet & Politics Standing Group (SG)
- International Communication Association Communication & Technology (CAT) division
- National Communication Association (NCA) Human Communication and Technology Division (HCTD)
- Society for Social Studies of Science (4S)

== See also ==
- Digital history
- Digital humanities
- Internet research ethics
- Library science
- Web science

== Sources ==
- Consalvo, Mia; Ess, Charles, eds. (April 2011). The Handbook of Internet Studies (1 ed.). Wiley. doi:10.1002/9781444314861. ISBN 978-1-4051-8588-2. Archived from the original on 2022-09-10.
- Dutton, William H., ed. (2013). The Oxford Handbook of Internet Studies. Oxford Handbooks (1 ed.). Oxford University Press. doi:10.1093/oxfordhb/9780199589074.001.0001. ISBN 978-0-19-958907-4. Archived from the original on 2022-09-11.
