= Association of Internet Researchers =

Society for the advancement of Internet studies

The Association of Internet Researchers (AoIR) is a learned society dedicated to the advancement of the transdisciplinary field of Internet studies. Founded in 1999, it is an international, member-based support network promoting critical and scholarly Internet research, independent from traditional disciplines and existing across academic borders.

AoIR was formally founded on May 30, 1999, at a meeting of nearly sixty scholars at the San Francisco Hilton and Towers, following initial discussions at a 1998 conference at Drake University entitled "The World Wide Web and Contemporary Cultural Theory: Metaphor, Magic & Power". The inaugural conference was organised by Nancy Baym, Jeremy Hunsinger and Steve Jones at the University of Kansas in 2000, and attracted 300 scholars. As the Chronicle of Higher Education noted, its rapid growth during the first few years of its existence marked the coming of age of Internet studies. It has continued to grow, with a membership of approximately 1000 scholars. It supports AIR-L, a mailing list with over 7,000 subscribers.

AoIR holds an annual academic conference, as well as promoting online discussion and collaboration through a long-running mailing list. It also hosts a Mastodon instance, AoIR.social.

== Activities ==
The Association supports scholarly communication in a number of ways:

- It organizes an annual, peer-reviewed scholarly conference, which accepts paper and presentation submissions from all disciplines.
- As part of its annual conference, it hosts an annual one day interdisciplinary Doctoral Colloquium for Ph.D. students and an Early Career Researchers event for professionals who are in their first academic positions following the completion of the Ph.D.
- It hosts the AIR-L mailing list with over 5000 subscribers.
- It has published multiple editions of the Internet Research Annual with Peter Lang.
- It hosts working groups that produce reports of interest to researchers in the field, most notably the AoIR Guide on Ethical Online Research.
- It co-sponsors an annual issue of the journal Information, Communication and Society consisting of top papers from the annual conference.
- It publishes Selected Papers of Internet Research (SPIR), an open-access online collection of papers presented at the annual conference.
- It curates videos of its keynote and some of its other speakers on its YouTube page.

== Conferences ==
- 2026 - AoIR 2026: Regenerations, Mexico City, Mexico
- 2025 - AoIR 2025: Ruptures, Niterói, Brazil
- 2024 – AoIR 2024: Industry, Sheffield, United Kingdom
- 2023 – AoIR 2023: Revolutions, Philadelphia, United States
- 2022 – AoIR 2022: Decolonising the Internet, Dublin, Ireland
- 2021 – AoIR 2021: Independence (online)
- 2020 – AoIR 2020: Life (online)
- 2019 – AoIR 2019: Trust in the System, Brisbane, Australia
- 2018 – AoIR 2018: Transnational Materialities, Montreal, Canada
- 2017 – AoIR 2017: Networked Publics, Tartu and Tallinn, Estonia
- 2016 – AoIR 2016: Internet Rules! Berlin, Germany
- 2015 – Internet Research 16: Digital Imaginaries, Phoenix, United States
- 2014 – Internet Research 15: Boundaries and Intersections, Daegu, South Korea
- 2013 – Internet Research 14: Resistance + Appropriation, Denver, United States
- 2012 – Internet Research 13: Technologies, Salford, United Kingdom
- 2011 – Internet Research 12: Performance and Participation, Seattle, United States
- 2010 – Internet Research 11: Sustainability, Participation, Action, Gothenburg, Sweden
- 2009 – Internet Research 10: Internet: Critical, Milwaukee, United States
- 2008 – Internet Research 9: Rethinking Communities, Rethinking Place, Copenhagen, Denmark
- 2007 – Internet Research 8: Let's Play!, Vancouver, Canada
- 2006 – Internet Research 7: Internet Convergences, Brisbane, Australia
- 2005 – Internet Research 6: Internet Generations, Chicago, United States
- 2004 – Internet Research 5: Ubiquity?, Brighton, England
- 2003 – Internet Research 4: Broadening the Band, Toronto, Canada
- 2002 – Internet Research 3: Net/Work/Theory, Maastricht, Netherlands
- 2001 – Internet Research 2: InterConnections, Minneapolis, United States
- 2000 – Internet Research 1: The State of the Interdiscipline, Lawrence, United States

== Presidents ==
#	Name	Term
1	Steve Jones	1999–2003
2	Nancy Baym	2003–2005
3	Matthew Allen	2005–2007
4	Charles Ess	2007–2009
5	Mia Consalvo	2009–2011
6	Alexander Halavais	2011–2013
7	Lori Kendall	2013–2015
8	Jennifer Stromer-Galley	2015–2017
9	Axel Bruns	2017–2019
10	Lynn Schofield Clark	2019–2021
11	Tama Leaver	2021–2023
12	Nicholas John	2023–2025
13	Sarah T. Roberts	2025–2027
