= Vignette =

Vignette may refer to:

== Arts, entertainment and culture ==
=== Music ===
- Vignettes (Marilyn Crispell album), 2007
- Vignettes (Ray Drummond album), 1995
- Vignette (song), a 2024 song by Twenty One Pilots

=== Books ===
- Vignette (graphic design), decorative designs in books (originally in the form of leaves and vines) to separate sections or chapters
- Vignette (literature), short, impressionistic scenes that focus on one moment or give a particular insight into a character, idea, or setting

=== Other in arts and entertainment ===
- Vignette (entertainment), a sketch in a sketch comedy
- Vignette (model), a form of diorama
- Vignette (philately), the central part of a stamp design
- Vignette (professional wrestling), a video package used to promote wrestling characters or storylines

== Other uses ==
- Vignette Corporation, a Texas-based commercial software company
- Vignette (road tax), a small, colored sticker affixed to motor vehicles in some European nations to indicate road tolls have been paid
- Vignette (psychology), a description of an event, behaviour or person used in a psychology experiment to control information provided to participants
- Vignette (survey), a research method in quantitative surveys or as part of qualitative studies that pretest surveys
- Vignette (vineyard), in viticulture, part of a larger consolidated vineyard
- Vignetting in photography, any process by which there is loss in clarity towards the corners and sides of an image
