= Interview =

Structured series of questions and answers

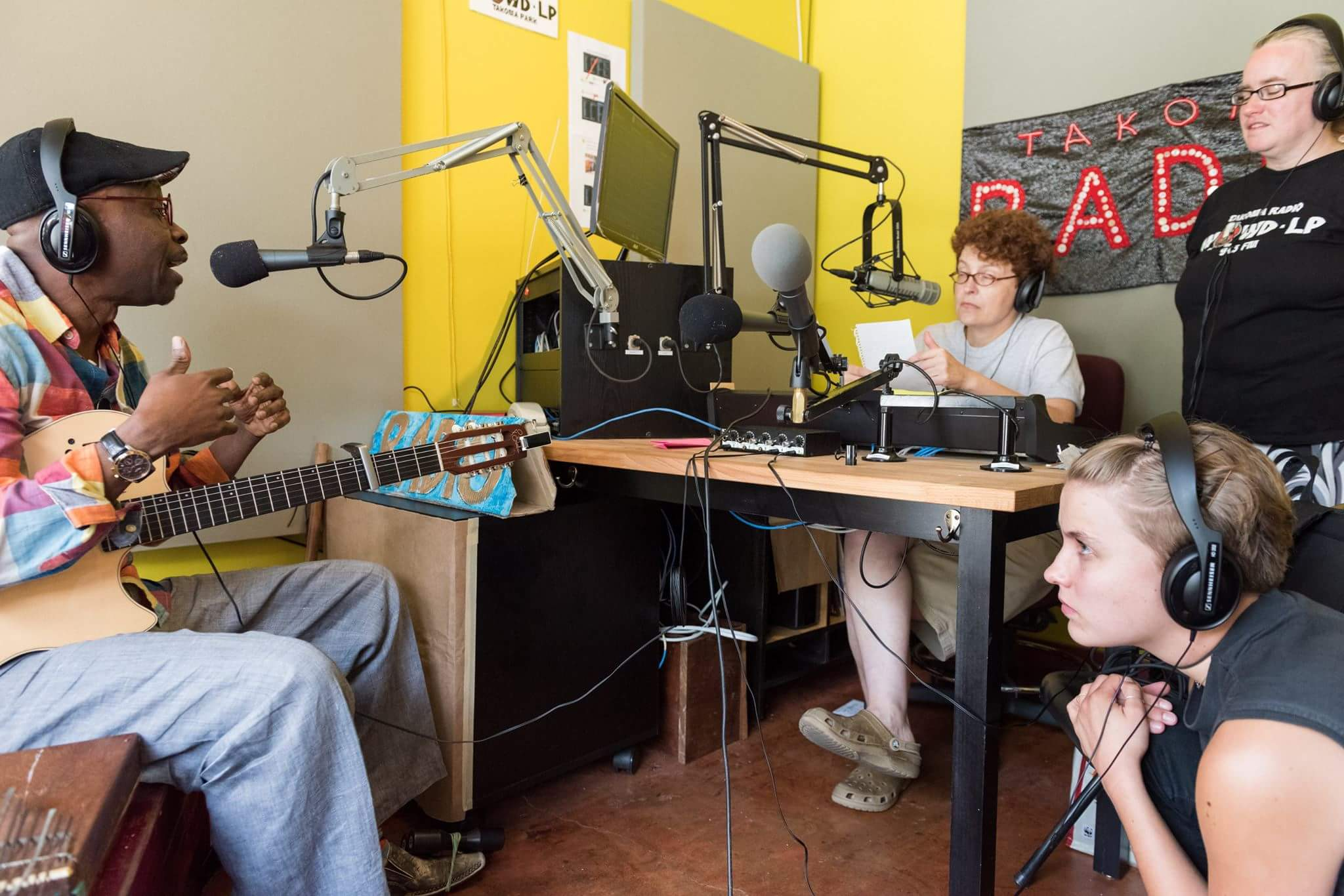
A musician interviewed in a radio studio

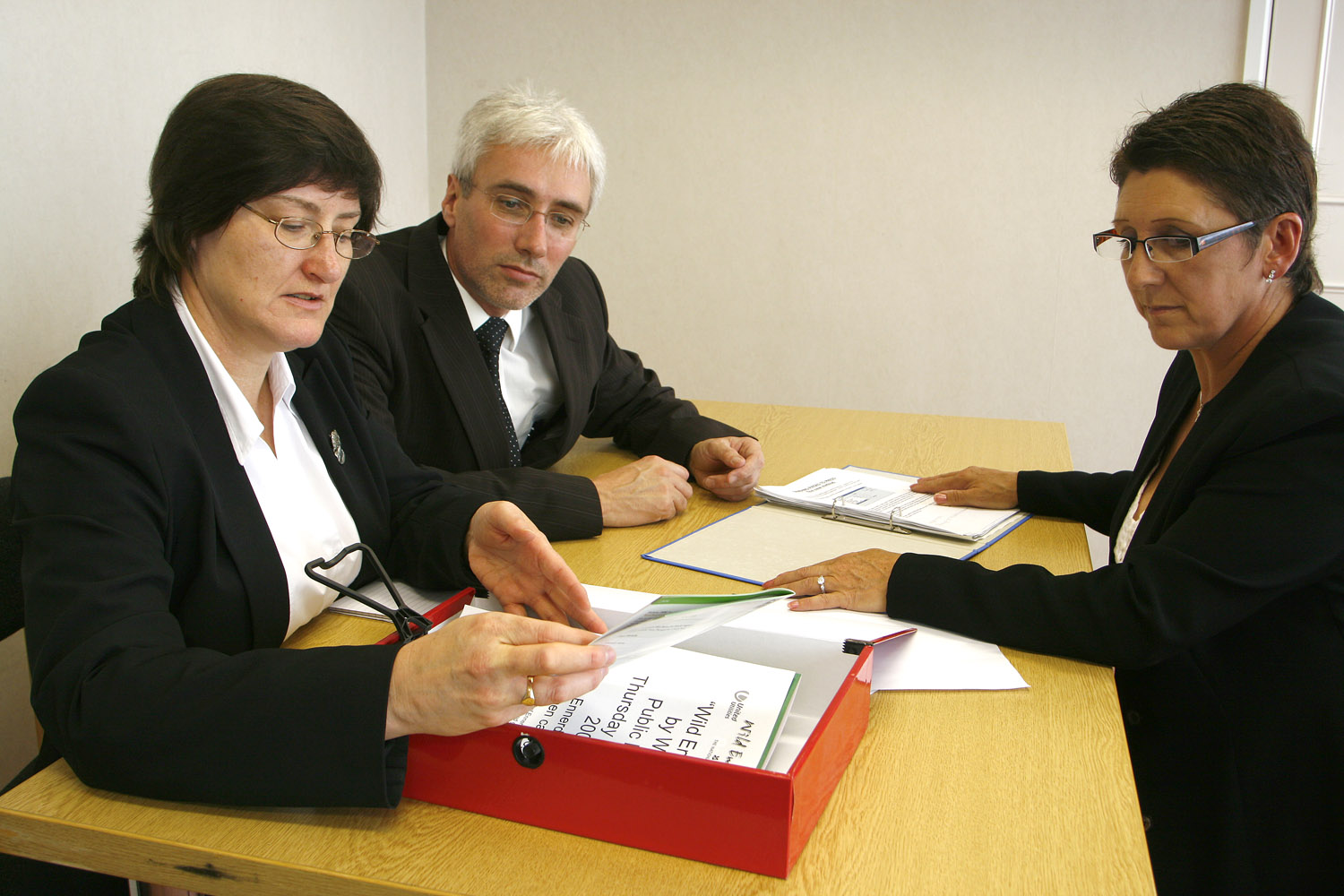
A woman interviewing for a job

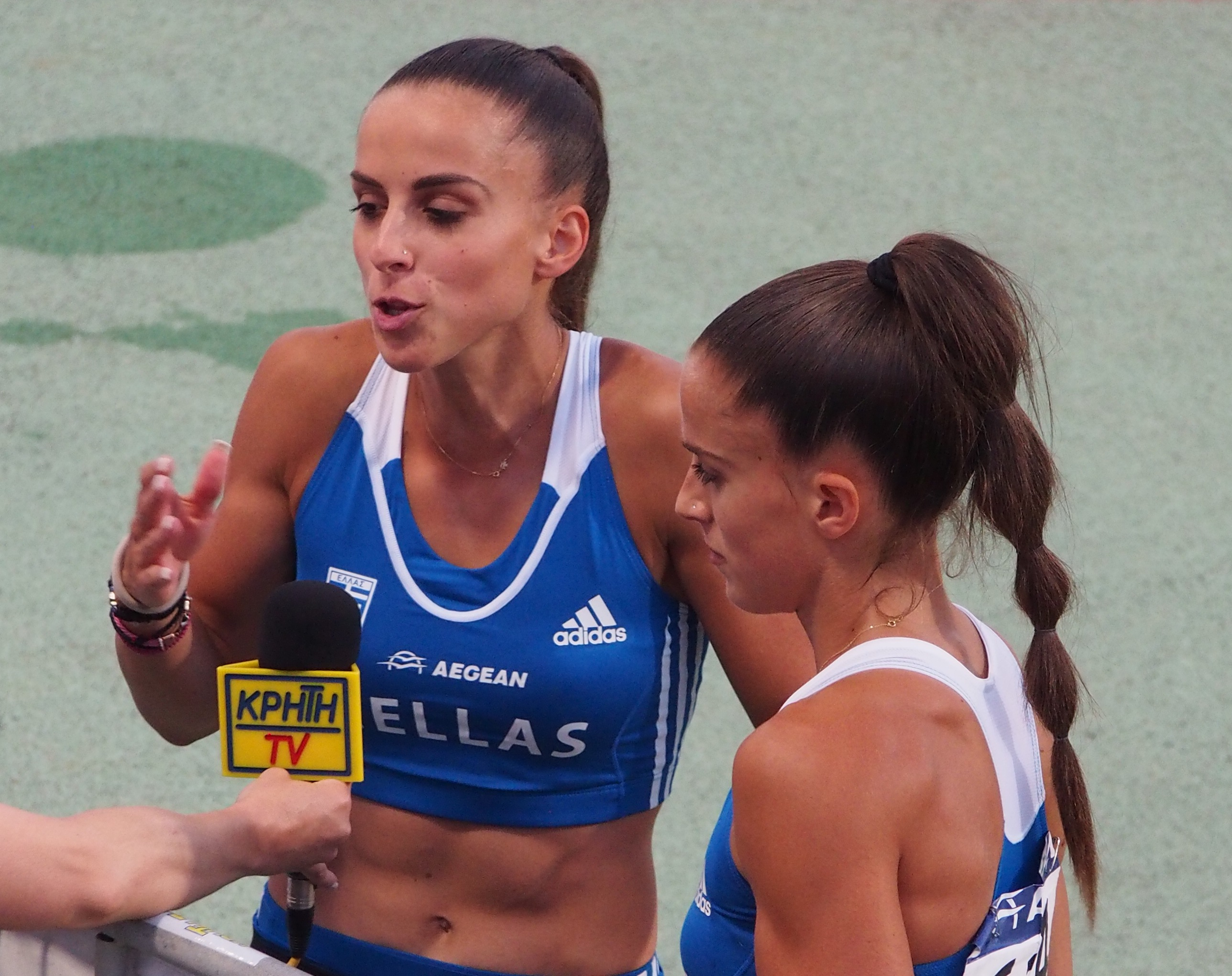
Athletes interviewed after a race

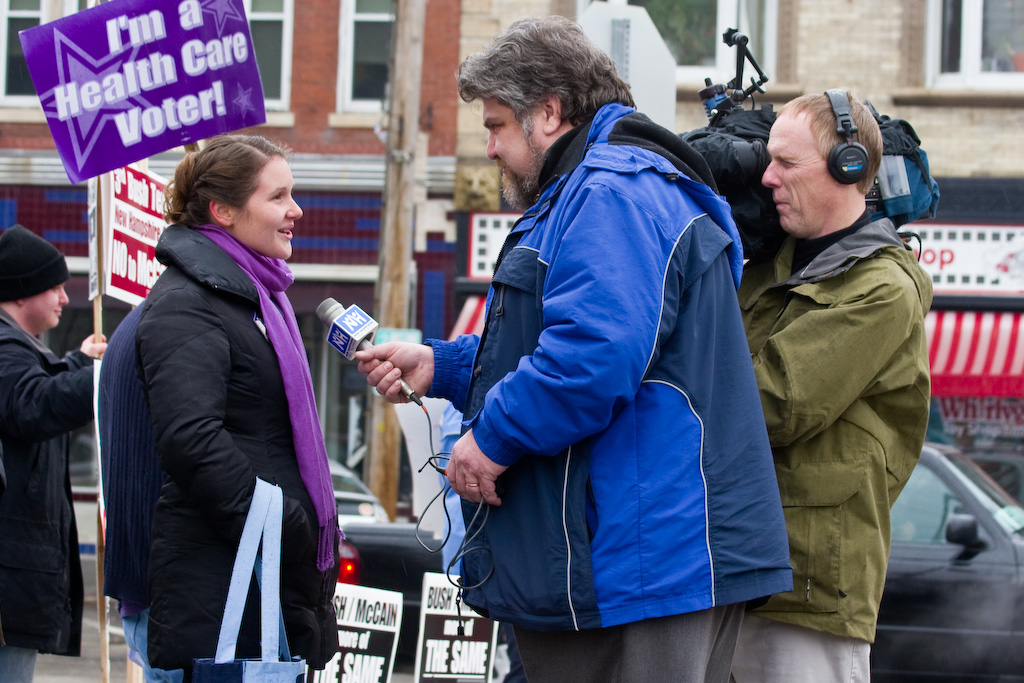
Street interview with a member of the public

An interview is a form of journalism that is a structured conversation where one participant asks questions, and the other provides answers. In common parlance, the word "interview" refers to a one-on-one between an interviewer and an interviewee. The interviewer asks questions to which the interviewee responds, usually providing information. That information may be used or provided to other audiences immediately or later. This feature is common to many types of interviews – a job interview or an interview with a witness to an event may have no other audience present at the time, but the answers will later be provided to others in the employment or investigative process. An interview may also transfer information in both directions.

Interviews usually take place face-to-face, in person, but the parties may instead be separated geographically, as in videoconferencing or telephone interviews. Interviews almost always involve a spoken conversation between two or more parties, but can also happen between two people who type their questions and answers.

Interviews can be unstructured, freewheeling, and open-ended conversations without a predetermined plan or prearranged questions. One form of unstructured interview is a focused interview in which the interviewer consciously and consistently guides the conversation so that the interviewee's responses do not stray from the main research topic or idea. Interviews can also be highly structured conversations in which specific questions occur in a specified order. They can follow diverse formats; for example, in a ladder interview, a respondent's answers typically guide subsequent interviews, with the object being to explore a respondent's subconscious motives. Typically the interviewer has some way of recording the information that is gleaned from the interviewee, often by keeping notes with a pencil and paper, or with a video or audio recorder.

The traditionally two-person interview format, sometimes called a one-on-one interview, permits direct questions and follow-ups, which enable an interviewer to better gauge the accuracy and relevance of responses. It is a flexible arrangement in the sense that subsequent questions can be tailored to clarify earlier answers. Further, it eliminates possible distortion due to other parties being present. Interviews have taken on an even more significant role, offering opportunities to showcase not just expertise, but also adaptability and strategic thinking.

== Contexts ==
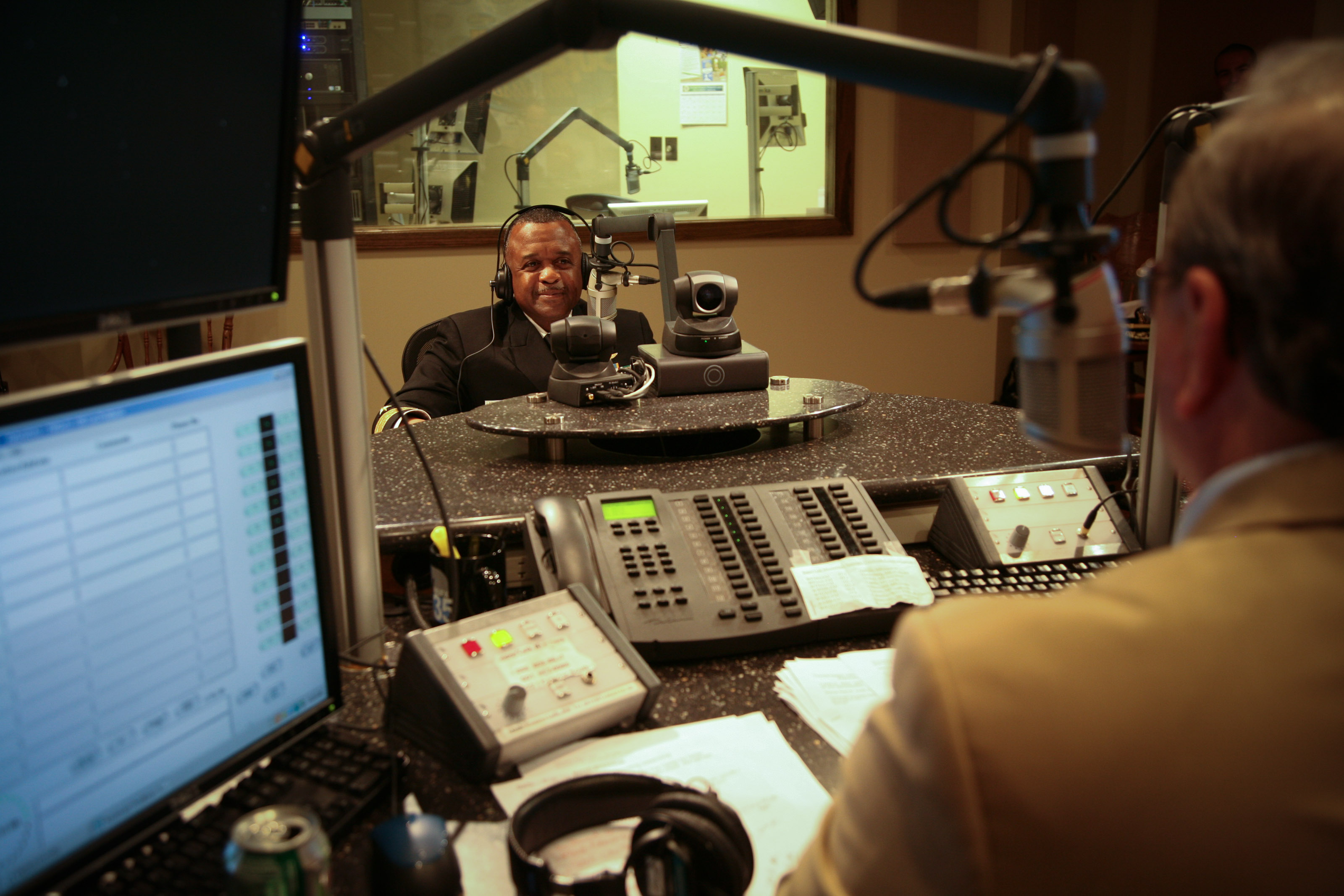
A radio interview

Interviews can happen in a wide variety of contexts:

- Employment. A job interview is a formal consultation for evaluating the qualifications of the interviewee for a specific position. One type of job interview is a case interview in which the applicant is presented with a question or task or challenge, and asked to resolve the situation. Candidates may be treated to a mock interview as a training exercise to prepare the respondent to handle questions in the subsequent 'real' interview. A series of interviews may be arranged, with the first interview sometimes being a short screening interview, followed by more in-depth interviews, usually by company personnel who can ultimately hire the applicant. Technology has enabled new possibilities for interviewing; for example, video telephony has enabled interviewing applicants from afar, which is becoming increasingly popular.
- Psychology. Psychologists use a variety of interviewing methods and techniques to try to understand and help their patients. In a psychiatric interview, a psychiatrist or psychologist or nurse asks a battery of questions to complete what is called a psychiatric assessment. Sometimes two people are interviewed by an interviewer, with one format being called couple interviews. Criminologists and detectives sometimes use cognitive interviews on eyewitnesses and victims to try to ascertain what can be recalled specifically from a crime scene, hopefully before the specific memories begin to fade in the mind.
- Marketing and Academic. In marketing research and academic research, interviews are used in a wide variety of ways as a method to do extensive personality tests. Interviews are the most used form of data collection in qualitative research. Interviews are used in marketing research as a tool that a firm may utilize to gain an understanding of how consumers think, or as a tool in the form of cognitive interviewing (or cognitive pretesting) for improving questionnaire design. Consumer research firms sometimes use computer-assisted telephone interviewing to randomly dial phone numbers to conduct highly structured telephone interviews, with scripted questions and responses entered directly into the computer.
- Journalism and other media. Typically, reporters covering a story in journalism conduct interviews over the phone and in person to gain information for subsequent publication. Reporters also interview government officials and political candidates for broadcast. In a talk show, a radio or television host interviews one or more people, with the topic usually chosen by the host, sometimes for entertainment, sometimes for informational purposes. Such interviews are often recorded.
- Other situations. Sometimes college representatives or alumni conduct college interviews with prospective students as a way of assessing a student's suitability while offering the student a chance to learn more about a college. Some services specialize in coaching people for interviews. Embassy officials may conduct interviews with applicants for student visas before approving their visa applications. Interviewing in legal contexts is often called interrogation. Debriefing is another kind of interview.

== Interviewer bias ==
The relationship between the interviewer and interviewee in research settings can have both positive and negative consequences. Their relationship can bring deeper understanding of the information being collected, however this creates a risk that the interviewer will be unable to be unbiased in their collection and interpretation of information. Bias or discrimination can be created from the interviewer's perception of the interviewee, or the interviewee's perception of the interviewer. Additionally, a researcher can bring biases to the table based on the researcher's mental state, their preparedness for conducting the research, and the researcher conducting inappropriate interviews. Interviewers can use various practices known in qualitative research to mitigate interviewer bias. These practices include subjectivity, objectivity, and reflexivity. Each of these practices allows the interviewer, or researcher, the opportunity to use their bias to enhance their work by gaining a deeper understanding of the problem they are studying.

== Blind interview ==
In a blind interview, the identity of the interviewee is concealed to reduce interviewer bias. Blind interviews are sometimes used in the software industry and are standard in blind auditions. Blind interviews have been shown in some cases to increase the hiring of minorities and women.

== See also ==
- Repertory grid interview
- In research
  - Computer assisted telephone interviewing
  - Interview (research)
  - Knowledge transfer
  - Online interview
  - Mall intercept interview
  - Qualitative research interview
  - Structured interview
  - Unstructured interview
  - Interviewer effect
- In journalism and media
  - Interview (journalism)
  - Talk show
  - Vox populi or vox pop
- In other contexts
  - College interview
  - Reference interview, between a librarian
