= Semi-structured interview =

Social science interview method

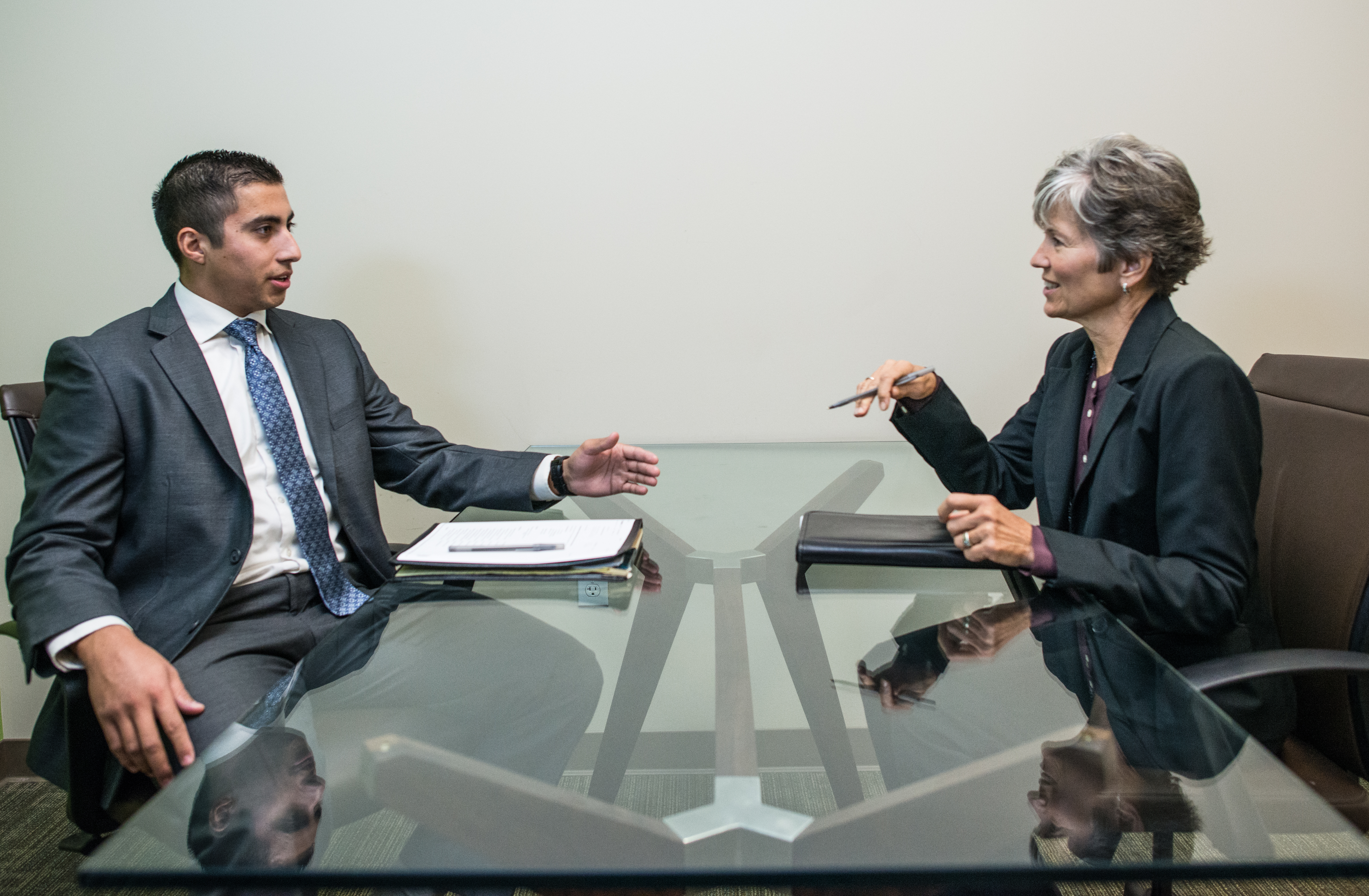
In semi-structured interviews, there will be central themes to explore, but the interviewer does not have to use a strict set of questions.

A semi-structured interview is a research method most often used in the social sciences. While a structured interview has a rigorous set of questions that do not allow deviation, a semi-structured interview is open, allowing new ideas to emerge in response to the interviewee's input. The interviewer in a semi-structured interview generally has a framework of themes to be explored.

Semi-structured interviews are widely used in qualitative research; for example, in household research, such as couple interviews. A semi-structured interview involving, for example, two spouses can result in "the production of rich data, including observational data." There is no universally applicable sample size for interviews.

== Comparison to other types of interviews ==
An unstructured interview is the opposite of a structured interview because it tends to be more informal and free-flowing, more like an everyday conversation. A structured interview is a type of interview that is fully planned, meaning every interviewee receives the same set of questions. A semi-structured interview is one in between. The questions are loosely structured and give interviewees more opportunities to express themselves fully. However, semi-structured interviews are less objective and more legally defensible than structured interviews. Semi-structured interviews somewhat restrict the interviewee's free flow of thought, limiting the interview's overall potential.

Because a semi-structured interview combines structured interviewing and unstructured interviewing, it has the advantages of both. For interviewers, the structured part of a semi-structured interview provides a general overview of the interviewees. It helps them draw an objective comparison based on the interviewees, which is useful for either a qualitative research study or a job interview. For interviewees, because the unstructured part of a semi-structured interview gives them more space to ask for clarification on their answers and to express their thoughts freely, they normally feel less stress during the interview. They would demonstrate stronger communication skills to the interviewers and build personal bonds with them in a warm, friendly atmosphere.

== Advantages and disadvantages ==
=== Advantages ===
Since a semi-structured interview combines the advantages of unstructured and structured interviews, it offers the best of both. The interviewees can express their opinions and ask questions of the interviewers during the interview, which encourages them to provide more useful information, such as their views on sensitive issues, for the qualitative research. And they could more easily give the reasons for their answers during the interviews. Plus, the structured part of semi-structured interviews gives the interviewers reliable, comparable qualitative data as well.

=== Disadvantages ===
Even though a semi-structured interview has several advantages, it requires interviewers to prepare and conduct research before starting the interview. And to ensure reliable results, interviewers need to interview a sufficient number of people. Since it allows people to express their thoughts freely, interviewers need to carefully plan questions to ensure they get the answers they want, which also requires strong communication and interviewing skills. Interviewers are responsible for the confidentiality of the interviews.

== Interview guides ==
The specific topic or topics the interviewer wants to explore during the interview are typically considered well in advance—especially for research project interviews. It is generally beneficial for interviewers to have an interview guide prepared. An interview guide is an informal grouping of topics and questions that the interviewer can ask in different ways for different participants. Interview guides help researchers to focus an interview on the topics at hand without constraining them to a particular format. This freedom can help interviewers tailor their questions to the interview context/situation and to the people they are interviewing.

There are several things interviewers should pay attention to when preparing and conducting interviews. When preparing for the semi-structured interview, the interviewers need to consider the characteristics of their questions. They should use open-ended questions, but avoid dichotomous questions that lead to only two opposite answers, and they should avoid asking multiple, leading, or why questions. It is helpful for interviewers to have a scale for grading answers before the interview. The drawback of the leading question is that it could subtly orient interviewers toward a certain way. And the downside of "why" questions is that they can make the questions sound judgmental and might elicit negative answers. During the interview, interviewers could try to restate and summarize the interviewees' answers to confirm their opinions. They could generate new questions based on interviewers' answers, but the questions should be around the particular qualities and experiences that they are looking for in interviewers. It is also helpful to take detailed notes or recording the whole interview to compare the answers afterward.

== Ethical considerations ==
Because semi-structured interviews allow people to communicate and express their free-flowing thoughts to some extent, interviewers need to pay attention to their intercultural competence and cultural dimensions during communication. Intercultural competence requires people to recognize and respect the diversity of different cultural backgrounds.

People with high intercultural competence often respect individual variations and diverse cultural patterns. They often complete self-assessments and are aware of differences among people. They make their conclusions and assessments based on reliable evidence. People can improve their intercultural competence through regular self-assessments of their values, beliefs, and personal biases, thereby enhancing their self-awareness. The interviewers need to understand that their personal beliefs and biases may slightly affect how they address questions and, as a result, influence the outcomes of semi-structured interviews.

Interviewers are also required to realize the cultural dimensions. A lack of recognition of cultural dimensions can lead to miscommunication and unpleasant outcomes during semi-structured interviews. A high level of cultural dimensions can be reflected, for example, in respecting masculine, individualistic, and uncertainty-avoidant cultures.
