= Americanos Poll =

The Americanos Poll, conducted pro bono by Encuesta, Inc., is an opinion poll whose purpose is to promote a better understanding of the U.S. Hispanic and Latino population. The surveys are conducted using a random sampling technique in order to provide an accurate representation of Hispanic public opinion in the United States. The polls often look at the U.S. population as a whole, in order to compare and contrast differences between Hispanics and non-Hispanics. The name of the poll, which means "Americans" in Spanish, was chosen to reflect the multicultural heritage of U.S. Hispanics.

Beginning in 2005, Americanos Poll studies have been conducted on a wide range of social, nonpartisan political, economic and consumer-related topics. Specific coverage areas include: health care and universal coverage, the financial status of low-to-moderate income Americans, presidential elections, media habits and brand preferences, to name a few.

The series has served as a source of information for media outlets and organizations that monitor the Hispanic/Latino population in the U.S. Findings are released to the public free of charge.
