= Vignette (literature) =

Short and descriptive story telling

- Formats: Prose
- Authors: Ernest Hemingway, Margaret Atwood, Sandra Cisneros, Alice Walker, Charles Dickens, William Makepeace Thackeray, William S. Burroughs, Tim O'Brien (author)

Related genres
- Sketch story, short story, flash fiction, drabble, slice of life

Related topics
- Literature, novel, poetry

A vignette (/vɪnˈjɛt/, also /viːn-/) is a French loanword expressing a short and descriptive piece of writing that captures a brief period in time. Vignettes are more focused on vivid imagery and meaning rather than plot. Vignettes can be stand-alone, but they are more commonly part of a larger narrative, such as vignettes found in novels or collections of short stories.

== Etymology ==
Vignette, French diminutive of vigne, from Latin vinea "vine, vineyard," came into English in 1751 to describe graphical embellishments resembling vines often added to blank spaces in books and later for decorative borders in the margins. In 1853, vignette went from books to photography for trendy portraits which gradually blended into the edges like a sketch—rough or unfinished visual artwork that focuses on its main elements. First recorded in 1880, vignette in this sense went back to books to describe a "literary sketch," reflecting the characteristics of a sketch: brief and spontaneous, with a sense of immediacy.

== History ==
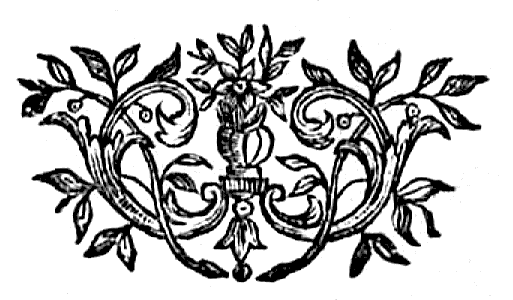
An example of a vignette used as a decorative artwork

In the 19th century, vignettes were found in newspapers and acted as brief and vivid descriptions of the news article's subject, from the perspective of the writer. According to Norman Sims (2007), these vignette sketches "provided writers with something we often miss today: the opportunity to write about ordinary life." These 19th century vignettes frequently offered few facts which could be verified, and tended to blend journalism with fiction. These vignette sketches provided writers with a sense of imaginative freedom, and reflected the larger Victorian movement of integrating real life and art. By blending fact and fiction, journalists could use their writing to explore their uncertainties and speculations about the subject.

During the 19th century, vignettes were written by anonymous authors, and attributed to the newspaper or journal they featured in. They were reused for new audiences and were therefore constantly revised and re-contextualised.

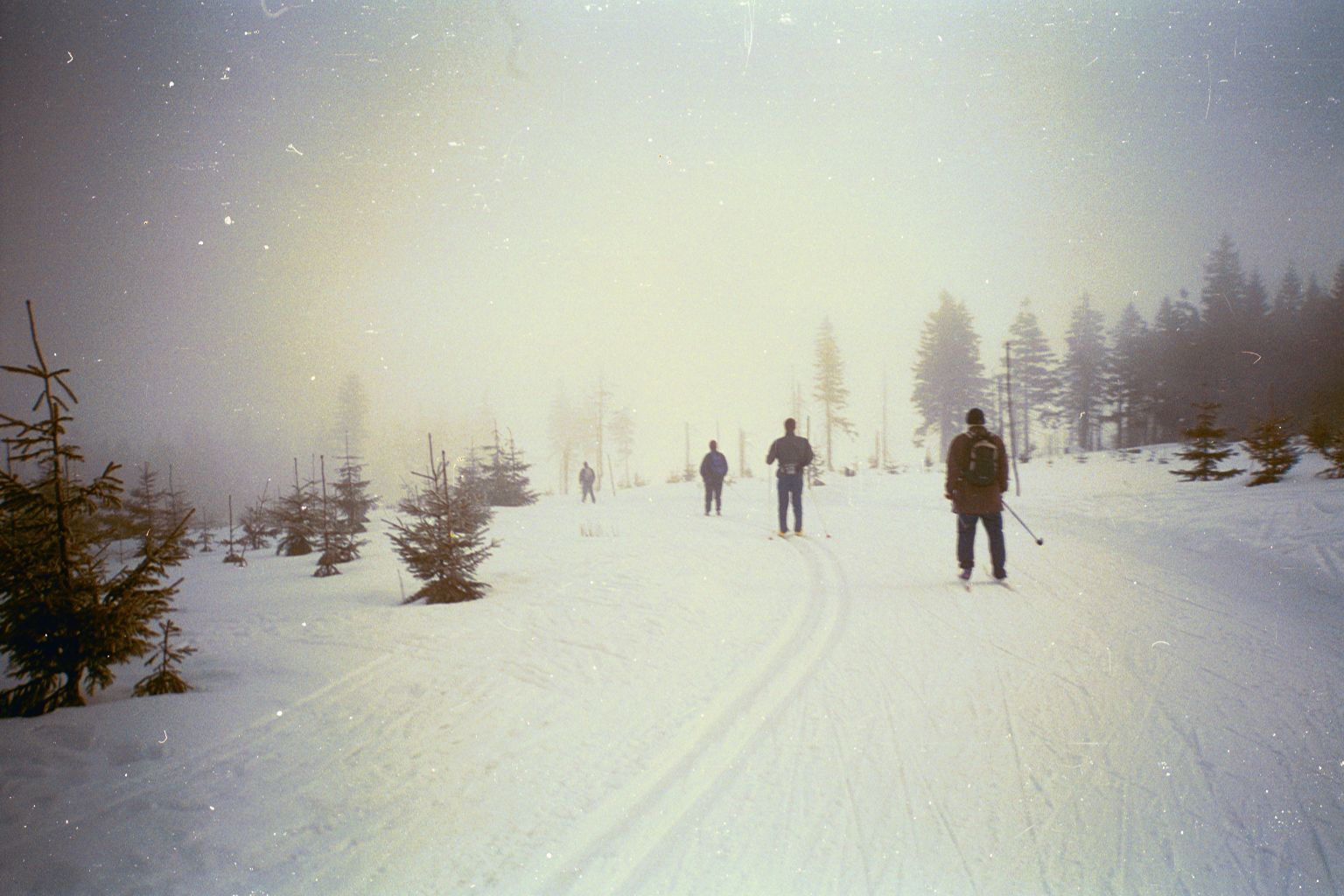
An example of a vignette photograph, with blurred and darkened edges

Later in the 19th century, vignettes in newspapers declined in use and popularity. This was due to journalism becoming more realistic and fact based. The decline of vignettes also reflected a broader shift in society towards scientific theories and realism. Journalism and literature separated into different, distinct branches of writing, until literary journalism emerged in the late 19th century.

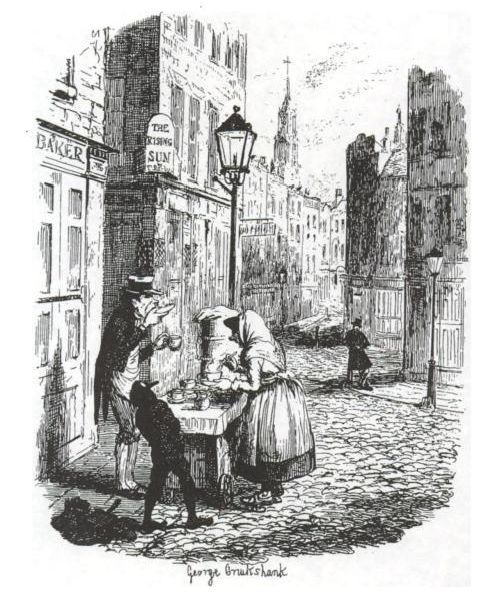
The Streets, Morning, illustration by George Cruikshank for Sketches by Boz by Charles Dickens

Aside from journalism, vignettes in the form of the "literary sketch" became popularised in the Victorian era by authors such as William Makepeace Thackeray and Charles Dickens, and their works would often appear in newspapers and magazines. Works such as Sketches by Boz by Charles Dickens, and Thackeray's Vanity Fair: Pen and Pencil Sketches of English Society, drew heavily from the original definition of a sketch in the visual arts by creating a sense of spontaneity, freedom and authenticity. These sketches sometimes included visual illustrations by George Cruikshank, and were viewed as rough drafts rather than complete works of literature - a necessary step towards creating a finished work, but not inferior to a finished work. The fragmentary and immediate style of these vignettes reflected the 19th century's sense of economic and social instability, and the rapid pace of urban life.

Dickens' sketches often described brief and immediate scenes of everyday life. The sketches represented a smaller part of a larger story and conveyed themes relevant to the Victorian Era such as social class, work and money. The use of common themes across different vignettes provides each story with an additional dimension of depth.

Due to the rise of post-modern and experimental literature after World War 2, attributes of vignettes resurfaced in popularity. Post-modern literature rejects the conventional "novel" structure and notions of a chronological plot and character development. Techniques in postmodern literature such as minimalistic, "slice of life" stories and fragmentation became popular, which are also key characteristics of vignettes.

== Style ==
Vignettes are written in a brief, concise style. They are rich in imagery to create a vivid, detailed description of a moment in time and a character's immediate experiences.

While short stories and flash fiction are complete works that follow a narrative structure of beginning, middle and end, vignettes do not follow this traditional narrative structure. A vignette contains less action and plot structure than flash fiction, and instead focuses on vividly capturing a single scene or a brief slice-of life moment in a character's experience. Vignettes are short and tend to be under 1,000 words in length.

As vignettes are often brief and do not allow for elaborate plot or character development, many writers craft vignettes to be part of a larger story or idea. For example, Sandra Cisneros' The House on Mango Street is the length of a novel but is a collection of individual vignettes. Each vignette explores common themes, motifs and characters that contribute to an overall plot. In Ernest Hemingway's collection of short stories In Our Time, individual vignettes integrate into an overarching narrative rather than acting as brief, isolated descriptions. Charles Dickens' collection of vignette sketches Sketches by Boz, although not contributing to a broader plot, explore common themes relevant to the Victorian era such as social class, adding a sense of depth and continuity.

Vignettes also appear in other creative forms such as web series, television shows, and films. For example, the web series High Maintenance uses vignettes to explore the lives of a different set of characters in each episode. This series uses the vignette style to vividly portray themes of the human condition, such as boredom and loneliness. Movies and television shows also use vignettes to reveal more details about the inner world and past lives of characters. The Netflix series Orange is the New Black uses flashbacks that act as vignettes to explore each character's past in more vivid detail. The 2018 Western anthology film The Ballad of Buster Scruggs is composed of six short films that act as vignettes.

Vignettes are also used in psychological research (see also: Vignette (psychology)) These vignettes may be based on previous research findings, or based on real-life examples. A potential limitation of using vignettes in psychological research is that individuals may respond differently to these fictional scenarios than their real-life response. Vignettes can also be used to provide a fictional example of a psychological concept. Vignettes have primarily been used by North American psychologists and in surveys. (see also: Vignette (survey)).

== Writers of vignettes ==
Writers of vignettes include Margaret Atwood, Alice Walker, Ernest Hemingway, V. K. N., Sandra Cisneros, William S. Burroughs, and Tim O'Brien.

=== Margaret Atwood ===
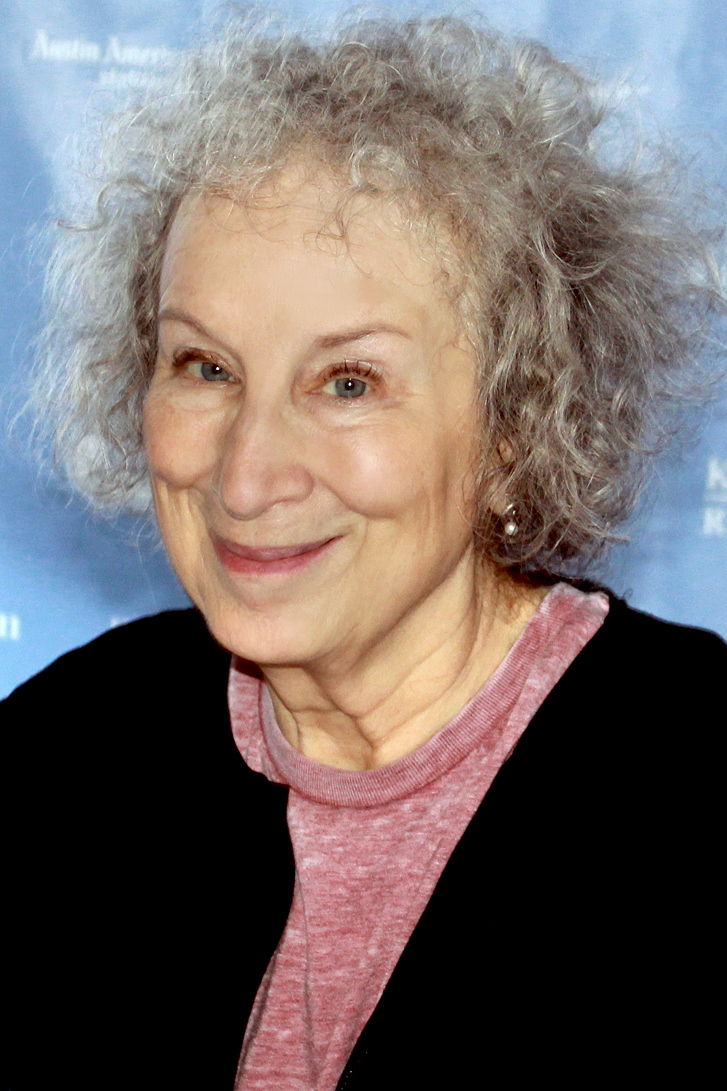
Margaret Atwood, 2015

Margaret Atwood is a Canadian writer whose works explore gender and identity. Written as a series of seven short vignettes, Margaret Atwood's The Female Body shows how perceptions of the female body differ between men and women. Only four pages in length, this series of vignettes highlights how the female body may be objectified.

=== Alice Walker ===
Alice Walker is an American writer whose works are known for their insight into African-American culture. Alice Walker's two-page vignette The Flowers depicts a young African-American girl discovering the body of a lynched man while walking in the woods. This vignette provides an insight into themes of racial violence and slavery, as well as commenting on the loss of childhood innocence and the coming of age.

=== Ernest Hemingway ===
Ernest Hemingway's In Our Time

Ernest Hemingway is noted for his novels and short stories, and was awarded the Nobel Prize for Literature in 1954. In Our Time is Hemingway's collection of short stories. The collection features untitled vignettes, which are fragmented yet integrated into an overarching narrative. The vignettes act as critical aspects of the overall stories rather than inconsequential descriptions. The writing style of In Our Time consists of succinct, declarative sentences characteristic of the Modernist period. In Our Time explores World War 1 and its aftermath, depicting themes such as masculinity, adaptation, maturity and responsibility.

=== V. K. N. ===
Vadakkke Koottala Narayanankutty Nair, commonly known as V. K. N. (7 April 1929 – 25 January 2004), was a prominent Malayalam writer, noted mainly for his highbrow satire. His work Payyan Kathakal is a collection of many small vignettes (even though not stand-alone, because of having the character Payyan as the protagonist in every one of them), which are plotless.

=== Sandra Cisneros ===
Sandra Cisneros is a Latina American writer, known for her bestselling novel The House on Mango Street. Written as a non-linear and fragmented collection of vignettes, The House on Mango Street explores Latin-American identity through the eyes of a young Latina girl growing up in Chicago.The House on Mango Street is a novel-length work consisting of individual vignettes that frame an underlying story. The vignettes in this novel contain succinct and readable phrases. They are written in a poetic style, containing imagery and metaphors, experimenting with rhythm and rhyme. The House on Mango Street explores themes such as coming of age, identity, class, gender, innocence, family and friendship.

=== William S. Burroughs ===
William S. Burroughs was an American writer known for his experimental novels that provide insight into themes of sexuality and drug addiction. His works were part of the Beat Movement. His experimental novel, Naked Lunch, is structured as a series of loosely connected vignettes. Burroughs himself stated that the vignettes have "no real plot, no beginning, no end," and that the vignettes can be read in any order: "Start anyplace you want. Start in the middle and read your way out. In short, start anywhere." Naked Lunch explores themes of drug use, homosexuality, violence, and paranoia. Due to its fragmented and non-linear narrative structure, Naked Lunch may be difficult to follow, and Meagan Wilson (2012) describes it as "a labyrinth of incoherent narrative fragments." The novel's publisher, Olympia Press, referred to the novel as "the great secret novel of the Beat Generation", and the novel gained a strong underground following.

=== Tim O'Brien ===
Tim O'Brien is an American novelist whose works depict American experiences of the Vietnam War. His collection of short stories The Things They Carried contains related vignettes that describe sentimental objects that soldiers took with them to the war in Vietnam. As well as objects, the vignettes depict emotions the soldiers experienced during the war, such as terror and homesickness. The Things They Carried blurs the lines between fact and fiction as the first-person narrator has the same name as the author (Tim O'Brien). Each vignette explores themes such as loss, displacement, memory, trauma, and the nature of truth. O'Brien's writing style in The Things They Carried is informal, colloquial, and straightforward. Some stories are told in first person from the perspective of protagonist Tim, while others are told in a more detached third person omniscient point of view.

== See also ==
- Drabble
- Flash fiction
- Novel
- Poetry
- Short story
- Sketch story
- Slice of life
- Vignette (psychology)
