= Couple interview =

Social science interview method

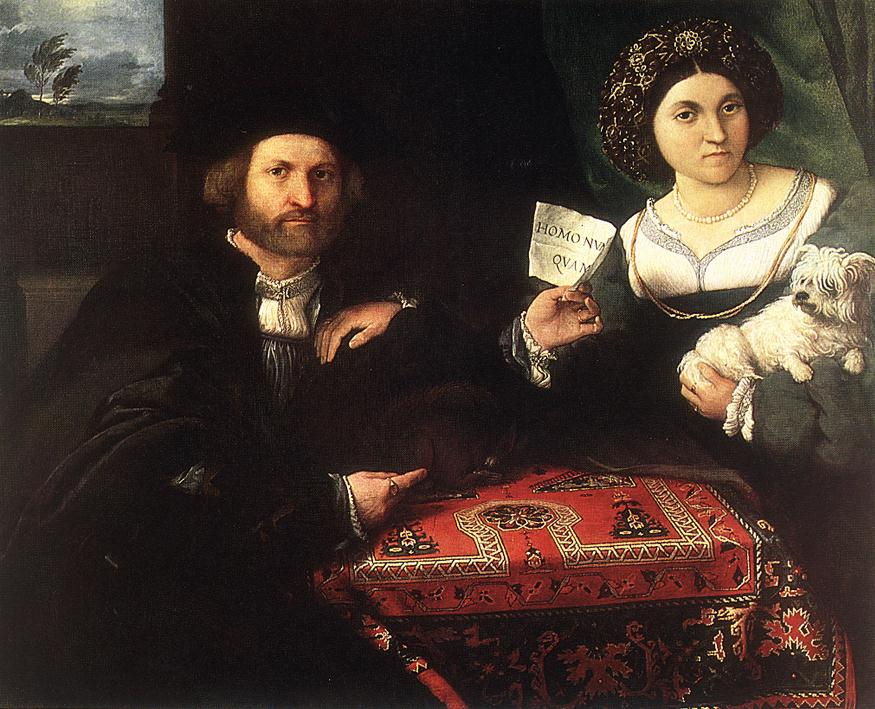
Husband and Wife by Lorenzo Lotto, 1523

A couple interview (or joint couple interview, or more broadly conjoint interview, joint interview or dyadic interview) is a method of qualitative research used in the social sciences, where two spouses are interviewed together. Such an interview is typically semi-structured or unstructured. Couple interviews are important in household research, often from a psychological, sociological, anthropological or social geographical perspective, and are also frequently used within health research. A couple interview is a form of joint interviewing (interviews involving two interviewees), the subject of a growing methodological research literature.

There is an ongoing methodological controversy over whether couples should ideally be interviewed together or apart. Bjørnholt and Farstad argue that the couple interview should be seen as a distinct form of the qualitative research interview, and argue that the couple interview has several advantages over individual interviews, in particular in "solving the ethical problems of anonymity and consent among interviewees, and [resulting] in the production of rich data, including observational data," and in intra-couple dynamics and the interaction between the informants, as well as with the researcher(s), in the interview situation, which may also reveal controversies and areas of conflict, by providing a reflective space for both partners together, which enables them to challenge as well as to reinforce each other's accounts. They further argue that the researcher plays an important role, as couple interviews may be seen as an arena of "family display", using a concept originally proposed by Janet Finch. The opportunity to observe shared storytelling is regarded as a widely documented advantage of joint interviewing.
