= Unstructured interview =

Interview in which questions are not prearranged

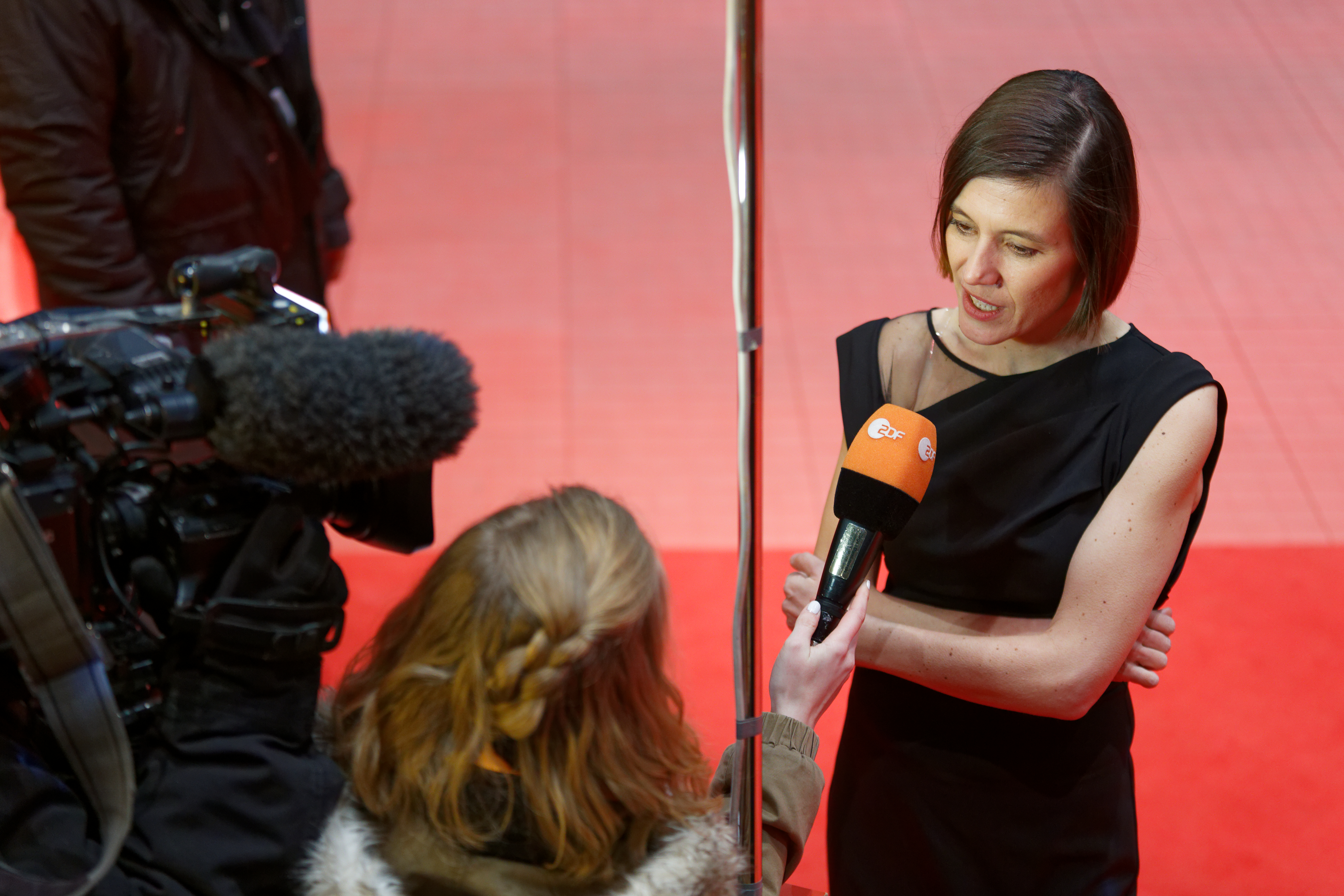
Television journalist interviewing actor Pia Hierzegger at a film premiere. Field interviews by journalists are more often than not unstructured, without many prearranged questions

An unstructured interview or non-directive interview is an interview in which questions are not prearranged. These non-directive interviews are considered to be the opposite of a structured interview which offers a set amount of standardized questions. The form of the unstructured interview varies widely, with some questions being prepared in advance in relation to a topic that the researcher or interviewer wishes to cover. They tend to be more informal and free flowing than a structured interview, much like an everyday conversation. Probing is seen to be the part of the research process that differentiates the in-depth, unstructured interview from an everyday conversation. This nature of conversation allows for spontaneity and for questions to develop during the course of the interview, which are based on the interviewees' responses.

The chief feature of the unstructured interview is the idea of probe questions that are designed to be as open as possible. It is a qualitative research method and accordingly prioritizes validity and the depth of the interviewees' answers. One of the potential drawbacks is the loss of reliability, thereby making it more difficult to draw patterns among interviewees' responses in comparison to structured interviews.

Unstructured interviews are used in a variety of fields and circumstances, ranging from research in social sciences, such as sociology, to college and job interviews. Fontana and Frey have identified three types of in depth, ethnographic, unstructured interviews - oral history, creative interviews (an unconventional interview in that it does not follow the rules of traditional interviewing), and post-modern interviews.

== Possible characteristics of a less structured interview ==
While the method of the unstructured interview varies widely, the chief feature of the unstructured interview is to reveal information from the respondent in a more neutral environment with less attached bias from the interviewer. This gives the unstructured interview an advantage over the structured interview in that it produces more reliable information and may enable the interview subject to bring forward experiences and knowledge that the interviewer had not previously considered. Each unstructured depends on the interviewer and interviewee together to create knowledge, and therefore the characteristics of the interview can vary from one conversation to another.

=== Light structure and preparation ===
To achieve the level of depth and detail sought after using the method of the unstructured interview, the researcher or interviewer may choose main questions to focus on, probing questions and follow-up questions. A central idea or topic is typically chosen before beginning an unstructured interview. Because the interview is occurring as a way of collecting data, it is also typical for the interviewer to gather knowledge of his or her respondent, whether that is about their career, studies, or work, as a place to start and continue the conversation. While the unstructured interview does not always have all these features, these main topics or questions serve to provide the conversation's "skeleton". Sometimes too much preparation is made when attempting to conduct an unstructured interview, and while not a negative method, such planning may lead to a semi-structured interview rather than an unstructured interview.

=== Open-ended questions ===
Open-ended questions have no prepared response choices which enables and empower the interviewee to shift the direction of the interview and to bring in unanticipated information. Whereas closed-ended questions require only that the interviewer read the question and marks the appropriate answer, open-ended questions "can require the interview to transcribe a lengthy statement". It can require a skillful interviewer to bring a talkative respondent back on topic. However, these open-ended questions give the ability for the respondent to reply about a topic which neither the interviewee nor the interviewer may have thought about before. Some evidence shows that using open-ended questions in interviews "result in greater reporting of sensitive or socially disapproved behavior than when closed-ended questions on a self-reporting questionnaire are used". Although open-ended questions can be used in both quantitative and qualitative studies, they are much more prominent and favored in qualitative work as they produce information from the respondents with greater detail and depth.

=== Neutral probes/non-biased encouragement ===
Although the method of the unstructured interview allows for social interaction and different modes of communication between the interviewer and interviewee, some maintain that it is important that interviewers resist the urge to agree, disagree, or give biased probes and encouragement to interviewees so that they do not potentially introduce biased topics. Interviewers must remember to minimize any form of bias within the conversation. This way, the interviewee is able to freely discuss the topic given or their work from their own point of view, typically something the researcher hopes for in their search for information. Others maintain that the interviewer may introduce encouraging nods, expressions and non-directive, neutral probes. From the participant, "They are generally very short, such as 'Why?' or 'Uh, huh' or 'That’s interesting.' The non-directive interview originated in psychotherapy, intending to neutrally probe the respondent's deepest and most subjective feelings". These acknowledgments such as "yeah," "right," "great," "okay," and "mhm" show response or influence from the interviewee's answers can have on interviewer, not through contributions to the development of the topic but through minimal feedback. If these acknowledgements are not used then the conversation can be seen as problematic. However, at its extremes, these neutral probes may activate repressed feelings that the respondent may or may not know he or she had or was not willing to admit to him or herself originally before the conversation. Typically these probes uncover important issues and topics that can eventually guide future inquiries.

=== Silence ===
Silence, being the apparent opposite of speech, is sometimes used in the method of the unstructured or non-directive interview. It is often suggested that silences may often be seen as awkward and are an enduring feature of human interaction. During more organized and highly structured interviews, questions are given and answered one after another, typically transcribed with little or no silences evident in between the responses. Oftentimes, it is up to the interviewer to present their interviewing skills by making sure the conversation does not hold any silences. However, with the fact that the unstructured interview is more like an everyday conversation, silence or the use of silence can be observed as a very important aspect of a natural conversation and in fact current research suggests that being attentive to silences will tell us a lot about how knowledge is constructed. Typically silence is overlooked in qualitative research, keeping in mind that there are multiple meanings involved in the conversation involving the interplay between speech and silence, it can be seen as one of the best types of probes used in interviews. Silences are profoundly meaningful as they can signify a withholding or resistance, can reflect a cultural mode of self-representation, or may represent a topic or idea as unthinkable. Many see the possible utility of silence as a strategic device to enhance data collection, while others argue that silence can be seen to represent failure on the part of the interviewer to ‘draw out’ information from the respondent.

== Advantages ==
=== More complex issues can be probed ===
An unstructured interview allows for the interviewer to build better rapport with the interviewee due to its parallels with a normal conversation. Unstructured interviews can be particularly useful when asking about personal experiences. In an unstructured interview the interviewer is able to discover important information which did not seem relevant before the interview and the interviewer can ask the participant to go further into the new topic. For this reason they are often considered to be a better methodology for researching sensitive subjects, such as domestic violence, whereas structured interviews are often considered intimidating due to their formality and can often make the interviewee subject to social desirability bias, a tendency for participants to answer questions inaccurately to suit response that can be viewed favorably by others.

=== Readability and validity of the unstructured interview ===
It is argued that the unstructured interview can sometimes be more valid than the highly structured interview. According to Gorden, more valid responses may be created by letting the respondent follow what he calls "the natural paths of free association". "The universe of discourse" varies from respondent to respondent so that the interviewer must change the question wording to meet the understanding of each individual participant. Another situation where the unstructured interview is said to be more valid than the structured interview is where the respondent is experiencing memory failure. The unstructured interview enables the interviewer to return to the same topic numerous times, allowing the interviewee is able to produce information with stimulated memory. With the interview being more like an everyday conversation, a safe and relaxed environment can be created within the space of the interview; unlike the highly structured interview where the respondent may feel stressed in its more hurried and formal environment and may not respond accurately if they feel the need to move on to the next question.

=== Balance in power relationships ===
The in-depth non-directive interviewing method implies an egalitarian relationship between the interviewer and the interviewee. Rather than focusing on the interview as a method of data retrieval, it is the interviewee's unique account which is being sought and highly valued. Instead of entering into the conversation formally with structure where the interviewer holds power over the conversation and determines how it evolves, "the interviewer attempts to retrieve interviewee's world by understanding their perspective in a language that is natural to them". Ethnographic interviewing methods are a large example of how unstructured interviews can balance power relationships between the interviewer and interviewee. Ethnographic interviewing originated in studies of cultural anthropology, emphasizing on the quality of the relationship with respondents. Ethnographic interviews are normally conducted in the form of the unstructured interview with participants from a particular culture in which the interviewer or researcher wishes to obtain knowledge from. The key feature to this approach is that the "researcher is there to learn from the respondent rather than impose an external frame of reference, epitomized in Spradely's (1979: 34) representation of the researcher's posture as being that 'I want to know what you know in the way that you know it...Will you become my teacher and help me understand?'". Life history interviews can be seen as a form of the ethnographic interview using the unstructured interview approach as they often share emphases documenting the respondent's life, or an aspect of it that has developed over the life course.

== Disadvantages ==
=== Time-consuming ===
Unstructured interviews are a lot more time-consuming in comparison to other research methods. This is because there are typically no prearranged questions asked during an unstructured interview, and if there are questions prepared, they are open-ended questions, which can result in elaborate answers. These open-ended questions "can require the interviewer to transcribe a lengthy statement". As a result, the unstructured interview is sometimes expensive and only feasible with small samples, affecting the data's generalizability and representativeness. However, current research shows there is a need to take up the unstructured interview in order to address unbalanced minority representation in research methods.

=== Opportunity for bias ===
It is important to understand that bias or the use of bias during an interview from the researcher is an important aspect that greatly affects validity of the interview's gathered knowledge. Since the interview is more like an everyday conversation, some claim that there are opportunities for the interviewer's bias to be brought into discussion and to intervene than with the structured interview. Others maintain that "Although there is invariable potential for the interviewer bias in qualitative interviews, it is offset, at least to some extent, by the greater participation and involvement of the interviewer in the interaction aimed at reaching greater depth". While the unstructured interview can be seen to be unreliable due to the interviewer, bias can be easily be built into a highly structured interview. However, it is important to find where one stands with their bias, acknowledging their biases rather than trying to do away with it. The notion of bias is evident in that anything quantitative already holds bias and biases are already built into everyday form. "Although typical of the selection process, the research on interviews suggests that unstructured procedures are vulnerable to a variety of biases that can lower the quality of decisions," such as gathering information on an applicant's traits during a job interview and selecting applicants determined by their qualifications. Any interview can also be subject to stereotypes and discrimination. Newell and Rice suggest that many of the problems involved with predictive validity during interviews are due to interpersonal perception, the interpretation of the interviewee's personality or social identity. Race, gender, class, religion, [and forms of disabilities] are all aspects of society that feed into the development of our social identity, however these can also be factors which bias people's interpretations in an interview.

=== Perceived difficulties in comparing data ===
The outcome of unstructured interviews results in diverse types of information collected from interviewees who are asking different questions. While the data from an unstructured interview has more quality than that obtained from a structured interview, in the sense that the participant has more of an opportunity to say what they like freely, the data collected in unstructured interviews is also prone to digression and much of the data collected could be worthless. Some suggest that this limits the comparability of responses and the outcome is thereby a less systematic and comprehensive set of data which may make organization and analysis of the data difficult. The data gathered though unstructured interviews are difficulty to analyze because the kind of data obtained during the interview are unpredictable and open in nature, thereby making it hard to make comparisons across data.

== Types of use in feminist research methods ==
Feminist researchers often use unstructured interviews as opposed to more structured interview in terms of research techniques because it attempts to eliminate power imbalances in the relationship between the interviewer and the interviewee. Some feminist researchers are influenced by the works of writer and researcher, Ann Oakley, who pioneered an interview methodology based on an anti-oppression framework. Oakley argues that the form of structured interviews positions the interviewee as a subordinate, which supports the masculine "paradigm of inquiry" and produces a "perfect interview" that is "morally indefensible". As an alternative, Oakley writes that "the best way to find out about someone else's lives is through non-hierarchical relationships where the interviewer is prepared to invest their own personal identity in the research relationship, answering questions and sharing knowledge". Oakley argues that interviews need to be conducted as equal relationships so that the research can lead to a retrieval of more fruitful and significant data. Together, Howard Becker and Oakley have argued that interviews should be more natural and more like an everyday conversation. Oakley argues that traditional guidelines contradict the aims of feminist research and that for a feminist interviewing women, the "use of prescribed interviewing practice is morally indefensible [and] general and irreconcilable contradictions at the heart of the textbook are exposed". This approach is viewed by many contemporary researchers as ethically responsible and it is very relevant in terms of developing research approaches that are grounded by the experience of in minorities. "Feminists have argued that the production of atomistic 'facts' and figures fracture people's lives" and letting others speak for themselves allows work to be produced which challenges stereotypes, oppression, and exploitation. Only one small part of experience is abstracted typically from structured interviews and questionnaires as the focus for attention as it is only "a simple matrix of standardized variables which is unable to convey an in-depth understanding of, feeling of, the people under the study". To break down imbalances of power within the relationships of the interviewer and the interviewee, the unstructured interview approach to research maximizes the ability to explore a full account of life experience. It can be seen that the principle belief of feminist research "must begin with an open-ended exploration of women's experiences, since only from that vantage point is it possible to see how their world is organized and the extent to which it differs from that of men". It is also important to note that this approach to research is used to explore life experience from those belonging to all other minority groups.

== Notable examples ==
=== Ann Oakley ===
Distinguished British sociologist, feminist, and writer, Ann Oakley has written numerous academic works focusing on the lives and roles of women in society. Oakley is a well-known pioneer in the unstructured interview research approach directed towards qualitative research that challenges existing power imbalances within the relationships of the interviewer and the interviewee. Oakley sees both issues as interlinked or, as she puts it "no intimacy without reciprocity". In 1974, Oakley interviewed women twice before the birth of their children and then twice afterwards. Each woman was interviewed for around nine hours on average. The women also asked her questions during the interviews and Oakley responded as openly and honestly as she wished for them to respond. Oakley wanted the respondents to be collaborators in her research rather than just interviewees causing the women to become increasingly interested in the research and contacting her with any information they thought important after the interviews. Oakley as well used the unstructured interview approach to study women's experiences of both house work and maternity care. Oakley interviewed 40 women about how much housework they did and how they and their partners organised domestic work. Both unstructured interview studies "were aimed at raising awareness of women's experiences and of promoting policy changes - for example, Oakley called for domestic work to be recognized as 'work' and to be given an appropriate status in relation to paid employment". These are prime examples of the advantages of rapport and the depth of information even beyond the interview using the unstructured interview research approach.

== See also ==
- Interview
- Semi-structured interview
- Structured interview
- Qualitative research
- Feminism
- Ethnography
- Postmodernism
- Oral history
- Validity
- Closed-ended question
- Bias
