= Interview (research) =

Research technique

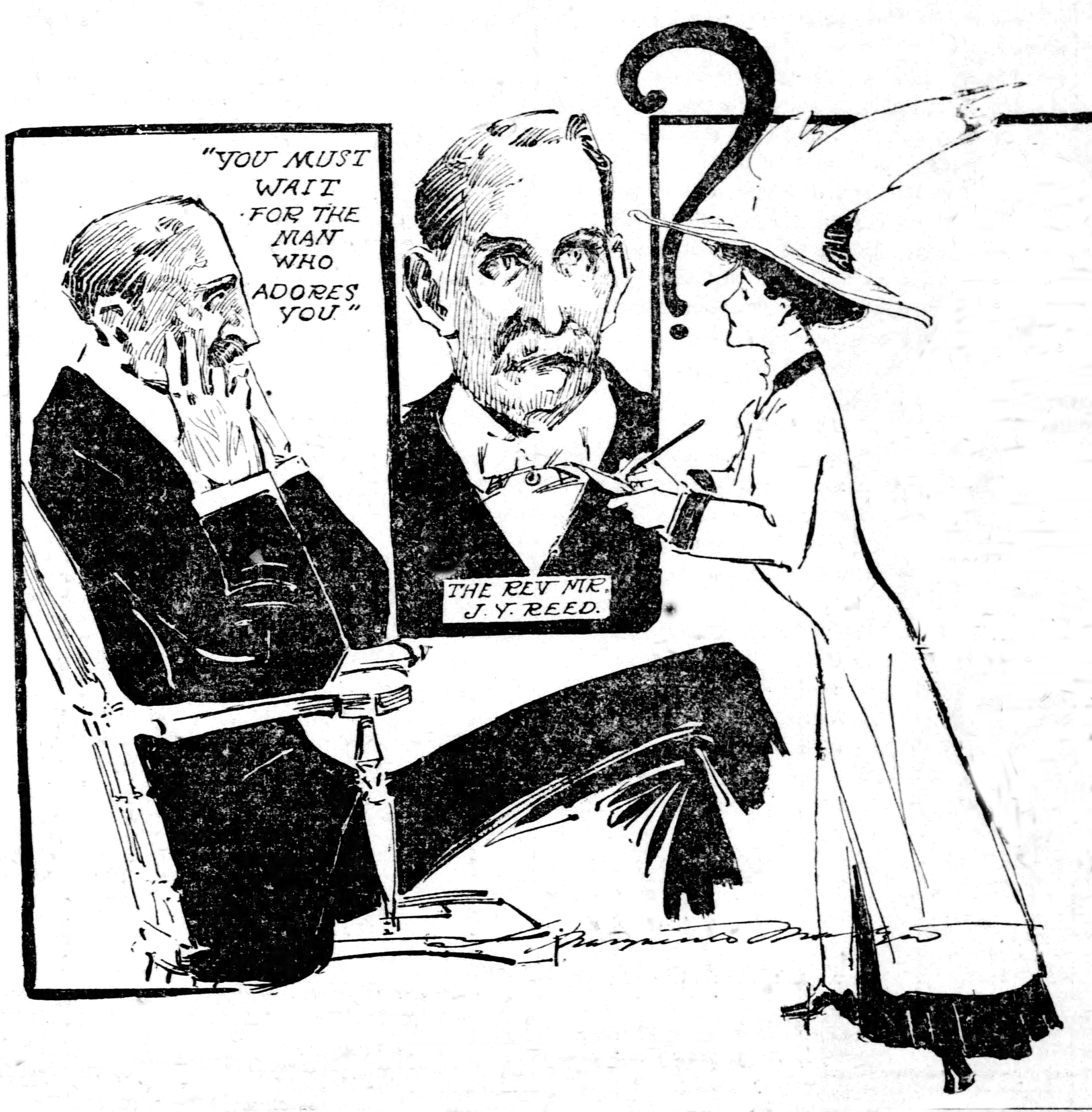
Journalist Marguerite Martyn of the St. Louis Post-Dispatch made this sketch of herself interviewing a Methodist minister in 1908 for his views on marriage.

An interview in qualitative research is a conversation where questions are asked to elicit information. The interviewer is usually a professional or paid researcher, sometimes trained, who poses questions to the interviewee, in an alternating series of usually brief questions and answers. They can be contrasted with focus groups in which an interviewer questions a group of people and observes the resulting conversation between interviewees, or surveys which are more anonymous and limit respondents to a range of predetermined answer choices. In addition, there are special considerations when interviewing children. In phenomenological or ethnographic research, interviews are used to uncover the meanings of central themes in the life world of the subjects from their own point of view.

== Characteristics of qualitative research interviews ==
Qualitative research interviews are completed by an interviewer who records what the interviewees say and do. The interviewer is considered a part of the measurement instrument and has to be well trained in how to respond to any contingency.

Compared to a mail questionnaire, interviews are a more personal form of research method because the interviewer works directly with the interviewee, has the opportunity to probe, and can follow up on responses. Because interviews provide an opportunity of face to face interaction between 2 persons, they reduce conflicts. It is believed that interviews are generally easier for the interviewee when the topic covers their opinions or impressions. However, interviews are time consuming and resource intensive.

== Technique ==
When choosing to interview as a method for conducting qualitative research, it is important to be tactful and sensitive in your approach. Interviewer and researcher, Irving Seidman, devotes an entire chapter of his book, Interviewing as Qualitative Research, to the importance of proper interviewing technique and interviewer etiquette. Some of the fundamentals of his technique are summarized below:

Listening: According to Seidman, this is both the hardest as well as the most important skill in interviewing. Furthermore, interviewers must be prepared to listen on three different levels: they must listen to what the participant is actually saying, they must listen to the "inner voice" or subtext of what the participant is communicating, and they must also listen to the process and flow of the interview so as to remain aware of how tired or bored the participant is as well as logistics such as how much time has already passed and how many questions still remain. The listening skills required in an interview require more focus and attention to detail than what is typical in normal conversation. Therefore, it is often helpful for interviewers to take notes while the participant responds to questions or to tape-record the interviews to be able to, more accurately, transcribe them later.

Ask questions (to follow up and to clarify): While an interviewer generally enters each interview with a predetermined, standardized set of questions, it is important that they also ask follow-up questions throughout the process. Such questions might encourage a participant to elaborate upon something poignant that they've shared and are important in acquiring a more comprehensive understanding of the subject matter. Additionally, it is important that an interviewer ask clarifying questions when they are confused. If the narrative, details, or chronology of a participant's responses become unclear, it is often appropriate for the interviewer to ask them to re-explain these aspects of their story so as to keep their transcriptions accurate.

Be respectful of boundaries: Seidman explains this tactic as "Explore, don't probe," It is essential that while the participant is being interviewed they are being encouraged to explore their experiences in a manner that is sensitive and respectful. They should not be "probed" in such a way that makes them feel uncomfortable or like a specimen in a lab. If too much time is spent dwelling on minute details or if too many follow-up questions are asked, it is possible that the participant will become defensive or unwilling to share. Thus, it is the interviewer's job to strike a balance between ambiguity and specificity in their question asking.

Be wary of leading questions: Leading questions are questions which suggest or imply an answer. While they are often asked innocently they run the risk of altering the validity of the responses obtained as they discourage participants from using their own language to express their sentiments. Thus it is preferable that interviewers ask open-ended questions instead. For example, instead of asking "Did the experience make you feel sad?" - which is leading in nature - it would be better to ask "How did the experience make you feel" - as this suggests no expectation.

Do not interrupt: Participants should feel comfortable and respected throughout the entire interview—thus interviewers should avoid interrupting participants whenever possible. While participants may digress in their responses and while the interviewer may lose interest in what they are saying at one point or another it is critical that they be tactful in their efforts to keep the participant on track and to return to the subject matter in question.

Make the participant feel comfortable: Interviewing proposes an unusual dynamic in that it often requires the participant to divulge personal or emotional information in the presence of a complete stranger. Thus, many interviewers find it helpful to ask the participant to address them as if they were "someone else," such as a close friend or family member. This is often an effective method for tuning into the aforementioned "inner voice" of the participant and breaking down the more presentational barriers of the guarded "outer voice" which often prevails.

== Virtual Methods of Interviewing ==
With the advent of new telecommunications technologies, and especially those which allow real-time conversation with both a visual and sound component (i.e. Zoom (software)), research interviews may take place online at times. The use of virtual interview methods increased following the isolation requirements of the 2019 Covid-19 pandemic, and remains in widespread use. Such interviews are often considered to have an equivalence to in-person interviews.

An Online interview may require additional considerations which are not presented in in-person interviews. For example, the natural constraints presented by travel to in-person interviews are not present for virtual interviews.

== Walking ('go-along' or mobile) interviews ==
Recent methodological innovation has seen the development of walking interviews as a novel approach to qualitative research. Walking interviews allow participants to encounter and to reflect on mobility through surroundings. Participants can draw on past experience and on sensory cues, enabling researchers to interrogate place-specific experiences. Specific examples include Edensor's work to evaluate the experience of walking in the British countryside, on the experience of people in wheelchairs in navigating urban environments and research on dog walking in urban environments.

== Strengths and weaknesses ==
There are many methods. When considering what type of qualitative research method to use, Qualitative Interviewing has many advantages. Possibly the greatest advantage of Qualitative interviewing is the depth of detail from the interviewee. Interviewing participants can paint a picture of what happened in a specific event, tell us their perspective of such event, as well as give other social cues. Social cues, such as voice, intonation, body language etc. of the interviewee can give the interviewer a lot of extra information that can be added to the verbal answer of the interviewee on a question. This level of detailed description, whether it be verbal or nonverbal, can show an otherwise hidden interrelatedness between emotions, people, objects unlike many quantitative methods of research.

In addition, qualitative interviewing has a unique advantage in its specific form. Researchers can tailor the questions they ask to the respondent in order to get rich, full stories and the information they need for their project. They can make it clear to the respondent when they need more examples or explanations.

Not only can researchers also learn about specific events, they can also gain insight into people's interior experiences, specifically how people perceive and how they interpreted their perceptions. How events affected their thoughts and feelings. In this, researchers can understand the process of an event instead of what just happened and how they reacted to it.

Another advantage of qualitative interviewing is what it can give to the readers of academic journals and papers. Researchers can write a clearer report for their readers, giving them a "fuller understanding of the experiences of our respondents and a greater chance to identify with the respondent, if only briefly."

Qualitative interviewing is not a perfect method for all types of research. It does have its disadvantages. First, there can be complications with the planning of the interview. Not only is recruiting people for interviews hard, due to the typically personal nature of the interview, planning where to meet them and when can be difficult. Participants can cancel or change the meeting place at the last minute.

During the actual interview, a possible weakness is missing some information. This can arise from the immense multitasking that the interviewer must do. Not only do they have to make the respondent feel very comfortable, they have to keep as much eye contact as possible, write down as much as they can, and think of follow up questions. After the interview, the process of coding begins and with this comes its own set of disadvantages. First, coding can be extremely time consuming. This process typically requires multiple people, which can also become expensive. Second, the nature of qualitative research itself, does not lend itself very well to quantitative analysis. Some researchers report more missing data in interview research than survey research, therefore it can be difficult to compare populations

== Participant in qualitative research interviews ==
Compared to something like a written survey, qualitative interviews allow for a significantly higher degree of intimacy, with participants often revealing personal information to their interviewers in a real-time, face-to-face setting. As such, this technique can evoke an array of significant feelings and experiences within those being interviewed.

On the positive end, interviewing can provide participants with an outlet to express themselves. Since the job of interviewers is to learn, not to treat or counsel, they do not offer participants any advice, but nonetheless, telling an attentive listener about concerns and cares can be pleasing. As qualitative researcher Robert S. Weiss puts it, "To talk to someone who listens, and listens closely, can be valuable, because one's own experience, through the process of being voiced and shared, is validated." Such validation, however, can have a downside if a participant feels let down upon termination of the interview relationship, for, unlike with figures like therapists or counselors, interviewers do not take a measure of ongoing responsibility for the participant, and their relationship is not continuous. To minimize the potential for this disappointment, researchers should tell participants how many interviews they will be conducting in advance, and also provide them with some type of closure, such as a research summary or a copy of the project publication.

On the negative end, the multiple-question based nature of interviews can lead participants to feel uncomfortable and intruded upon if an interviewer encroaches on territory that they feel is too personal or private. To avoid crossing this line, researchers should attempt to distinguish between public information and private information, and only delve deeper into private information after trying to gauge a participant's comfort level in discussing it.

Furthermore, the comparatively intimate nature of interviews can make participants feel vulnerable to harm or exploitation. This can be especially true for situations in which a superior interviews a subordinate, like when teacher interviewers his or her student. In these situations, participants may be fearful of providing a "wrong answer," or saying something that could potentially get them into trouble and reflect on them negatively. However, all interview relationships, not just explicitly superior-subordinate ones, are marked by some degree of inequality, as interviewers and participants want and receive different things from the technique. Thus, researchers should always be concerned with the potential for participant feelings of vulnerability, especially in situations where personal information is revealed.

In order to combat such feelings of vulnerability and inequity and to make participants feel safe, equal, and respected, researchers should provide them with information about the study, such as who is running it and what potential risks it might entail, and also with information about their rights, such as the right to review interview materials and withdraw from the process at any time. It is especially important that researchers always emphasize the voluntary nature of participating in a study so that the participants remain aware of their agency.

Sociologists Bredal, Stefansen and Bjørnholt identified three "participant orientations", that they described as "telling for oneself," "telling for others" and "telling for the researcher." They also proposed that these orientations implied "different ethical contracts between the participant and researcher."

These power dynamics present in interviews can also have specific effects on different social groups according to racial background, gender, age, and class. Race, for example, can pose issues in an interview setting if participants of a marginalized racial background are interviewed by white researchers, in which case the existence of historical and societal prejudices can evoke a sense of skepticism and distrust. Gender dynamics can similarly affect feelings, with men sometimes acting overbearingly when interviewing women and acting dismissively when being interviewed by women, and same-gendered pairs being vulnerable to false assumptions of commonality or a sense of implicit competition. In terms of class, participants of perceived lower status demonstrate, in some cases, either excessive skepticism or excessive submissiveness, and in terms of age, children and seniors may exhibit fears of being patronized. In order to minimize these social group related negative feelings, researchers should remain sensitive to possible sources of such tensions, and act accordingly by emphasizing good manners, respect, and a genuine interest in the participant, all of which can all help bridge social barriers.

Finally, another aspect of interviews that can affect how a participant feels is how the interviewer expresses his or her own feelings, for interviewers can project their moods and emotions onto those they are interviewing. For instance, if an interviewer feels noticeably uncomfortable, the participant may begin to share this discomfort, and if an interviewer expresses anger, he or she is in danger of passing it on to the participant. So, researchers should try to remain calm, polite, and interested at all times.

== Interviewing children ==
=== Key terms ===
Qualitative interviews are a way of gathering data that involve the researcher and participant/s engaging in a focused conversation. Interviews are considered to be "the most common method of gathering data for qualitative research"; further, they "are an integral part of most research traditions." Interviews may be structured, semi-structured, or unstructured. Semi-structured interviews, in which a researcher has questions to guide the interview while engaging and responding to the participant beyond the interview script, are recommended for work with children.

Children are individuals under the age of 18 who are considered a vulnerable population in research ethics. Research ethics refers to an aspect of research focusing on the "principles of right and wrong that a particular group accepts". Due to the young age of children, consent must be obtained from parents prior to engaging children in research.

=== Historical background ===
Child development and psychology has played a role in the development of including children's perspectives in research. While not all children follow a linear trajectory of development, it has been found that children between the ages of five and seven are capable of discussing their opinions with others, and by age six, children can recount their thoughts and preferences. Between the ages of seven and eleven years old, children begin to use logic to solve problems and develop self-esteem; around age ten, children tend to be able to effectively convey their thoughts and emotions to one another. These findings indicate children have the skills to discuss their experiences, thoughts, and emotions; they can be considered experts on their own lives. Much of the methodological resources that discuss strategies for interviewing children present information from child development as a justification of this practice.

Qualitative research has more recently begun discussing the ethics of interviewing children. Theoretical shifts in the 1990s paved the way to including children's voices in research. The theoretical concept of children's agency arose, emphasizing the belief that children are "capable of making sense of their views, and sharing...them... [Further,] as human beings, they are entitled to express these views". By conceptualizing children in this way, they become valuable research participants. Although children can participate in research, child-friendly and appropriate strategies are essential when conducting research.

=== Current practices ===
==== Ethical considerations ====
Key ethical considerations when interviewing children include ensuring informed consent and a willingness to participate or continue participation, managing the presence of a power dynamic between the researcher and the participant, and issues of disclosure.

A study of children in New Zealand with motor impairments addressed both informed consent and a willingness to participate through the use of five strategies intended to help children decide whether or not they wanted to participate in the study. Strategies included providing an information sheet, interview guide of questions, consent form and questionnaires in child-friendly language and formats, an invitation letter with flexible data collection strategies, child-selected interview setting, and inviting parents to be present during the interview. A study utilizing visual data also employed similar strategies after obtaining parent consent. To further address children's willingness to participate, researchers engaged in responsive, semi-structured interviews in which children were allowed to guide the interview process.

The power dynamic of an adult researcher and a child participant is an important ethical consideration. Researchers must recognize that they are inherently in a position of power when working with children, and this power dynamic impacts the interview process. Further, it is important for researchers to resist falling into a "teacher mode", which signals participants that there is a right or wrong answer to the interview questions.

Issues of disclosure are also present when interviewing children, as they are a vulnerable population, susceptible to oversharing. To manage this risk, researchers mitigate this issue by allowing the child to lead the interview, letting the child control how much they share with the researcher. Phelan and Kinsella also warn against creating an environment that is too comfortable for children.

==== Best practices ====
Best practices when interviewing children include ensuring participants' comfort, providing positive responses to children, allowing children to guide the conversation, completing the interview in a comfortable environment, and employing flexible, responsive methodology. Practices including allowing children to guide the conversation, the use of a comfortable environment, and flexible methodology are echoed in ethical considerations.

Adler, Salantera, and Zumstein encourage researchers to provide non-verbal feedback to children, such as nodding or raising eyebrows to indicate interest, but warn against affirmations that would cause children to limit what they're saying to what may be deemed interesting. In contrast, Poinzovsky-Bergelson, Dayan, Wahle, and Roer-Strier found affirmations and encouragement from researchers elicited what was deemed to be the richest data.

There is also conflicting research on whether researchers should ask 'why' questions to children. In a study of what encourages or inhibits children's participation in research, it was found that 'why' questions produced rich data, especially when combined with encouraging statements. However, previous research had suggested 'why' questions should be avoided when interviewing children.

==== Visual data ====
Visual data included photo elicitation, co-created visual data, and child-created visual data.

Photo elicitation interviews (PEI) can be implemented in research interviews; researchers may ask children to take photographs of their daily activities and discuss these photos in their interview. PEI has been found to be useful in reducing issues of disclosure and minimize power imbalances; in a study focused upon ethics of interviewing children, it was a successful method of engaging children in qualitative interviews.

Co-created visual data was created through participatory drawing; children create drawings around specified content at the request of a researcher. This model of interviewing to be easily implemented, engage students, and diminish barriers and power dynamics between the child and the researcher. Limitations present include challenges with interpretation of the visual data collected and the validity of these analyses.

Child-created visual data was utilized in the New Zealand study of children with motor impairments; students were asked to draw or paint their choice of leisure activity and then engaged in a conversation about what they drew. Drawing was found to be the second most preferred method of engaging in the interview among participants and was found to reduce anxiety for some children.

== Types ==
In an informal, conversational interview, no predetermined questions are asked in order to remain as open and adaptable as possible to the interviewee's nature and priorities. During the interview the interviewer "goes with the flow".

A general interview guide approach is intended to ensure that the same general areas of information are collected from each interviewee. This provides more focus than the conversational approach, but still allows a degree of freedom and adaptability in getting the information from the interviewee.

In a standardized open-ended interview, the same open-ended questions are asked to all interviewees. This approach facilitates faster interviews that can be more easily analyzed and compared.

In a closed fixed-response interview, all interviewees are asked the same questions and asked to choose answers from among the same set of alternatives. This format is useful for those not practiced in interviewing. This type of interview is also referred to as structured.

== Household research ==
Research on households pose specific ethical problems of anonymity and consent among interviewees, and there is an ongoing controversy over whether spouses should be interviewed in personal, individual interviews or in couple interviews.

== Interviewer's judgments ==
According to Hackman and Oldman, several factors can bias an interviewer's judgment about a job applicant. However these factors can be reduced or minimized by training interviewers to recognized them.

Some examples are:

- Prior Information: Interviewers generally have some prior information about job candidates, such as recruiter evaluations, application blanks, online screening results, or the results of psychological tests. This can cause the interviewer to have a favorable or unfavorable attitude toward an applicant before meeting them.
- The Contrast Effect: How the interviewers evaluate a particular applicant may depend on their standards of comparison, that is, the characteristics of the applicants they interviewed previously.
- Interviewers' Prejudices: This can be done when the interviewers' judgement is their personal likes and dislikes. These may include but are not limited to racial and ethnic background, applicants who display certain qualities or traits and refuse to consider their abilities or characteristics.

== Stages of interview investigation ==
There are seven stages in the interview investigation. Thematizing is the first stage and the why and what of the investigation are selected. It is followed by Designing which refers to the study design and planning. Interviewing takes place next, and the interviewer conducts the interview using an interview guide. After the interview, Transcribing must occur for the interview material to be prepared for analysis. The next stage is Analyzing, where decisions on made on the purpose, the topic, the nature and the appropriateness of the analysis methods. Verifying is a post-analysis step to ascertain the validity of the interview findings. Reporting is the final stage when findings of the study are communicated based on academic or client criteria.

== See also ==
- Survey methodology
- Cognitive interviewing
- Thematic analysis
