= Encuesta, Inc. =

Marketing company

- Type: Privately held
- Industry: Market Research
- Founded: 1989
- Headquarters: Miami, Florida, U.S.
- Website: www.encuestainc.com

Encuesta, Inc. is a U.S.-based marketing and opinion research company that specializes in customized quantitative, online qualitative, and ethnographic research focused on the U.S. Hispanic and Latino population. It is a privately owned company based in Miami, Florida, that was founded in 1989 by Martin Cerda. Specific areas of expertise include consumer habits and practices, brand awareness and usage, advertising tracking, brand equity market segmentation, and shopping research, to name a few, all generally focused on U.S. Hispanics (with some comparisons with U.S. non-Hispanics).

Additionally, Encuesta, Inc. is responsible for the Americanos Poll, an opinion poll created in 2005 to provide an accurate representation of U.S. Hispanic public opinion. Through the Americanos Poll (whose findings are released to the public free of charge), Encuesta, Inc. has demonstrated experience in studies related to public opinion and issue-oriented research, as well as political research.

Both Encuesta, Inc. and Americanos Poll studies are used as information sources for those looking for current findings on the Hispanic population in the U.S.

Encuesta, Inc. was an official partner of the 2010 Census Ya Es Hora, Hagase Contar! Initiative.

In June 2011, Martin Cerda resigned his leadership position and took on a role at Cheskin Added Value (part of Kantar and WPP). In January 2012, he parted amicably with Cheskin Added Value and returned to Encuesta, Inc. to dedicate his efforts to address the pressing issues related to conducting online and social media research among U.S. Hispanics.

The company ceased research operations in September 2012 and converted to a real estate holding company.
