= Mall intercept =

Marketing research technique

A mall intercept is a quantitative research survey whereby respondents are intercepted in shopping malls or other public spaces. The process involves stopping shoppers, screening them for appropriateness, and either administering a survey (or interview) on the spot or inviting them to a research facility nearby to complete the interview. Mall intercepts are frequently used as a type of marketing research.

Mall intercepts use convenience sampling and require respondents to be in the mall while data is being collected. Surveys that take place in malls frequently under represent lower-income and elderly populations. To reduce the impact of this sampling bias, some surveys use the format of a mall intercept outside of other public locations, such as grocery stores and municipal buildings. Researchers can also administer their intercept at various times of the day or near different mall attractions to ensure as accurate a sample as possible

Traditionally data collection for these surveys is done with the help of a person collecting data with pen and paper in a shopping mall. With advancement in technology, it is now being done on iPad, Android tablet or iPhone. The concept of mall interview has become a popular way to collect data.

== See also ==
- Computer-assisted personal interviewing
- Automated computer telephone interviewing
- Opinion poll
