= Ladder interview =

A ladder interview is an interviewing technique where a seemingly simple response to a question is pushed by the interviewer in order to find subconscious motives. This method is popular for some businesses when conducting research to understand the product elements personal values for end user.

== Example ==
The technique begins with a simple question, and then another question is asked about that response. For example, an interviewer may ask: "How come you skipped class?" and the response may be: "I went out with my friends". The next question would be something like "Why did you go out with your friends?". Essentially, the format is as follows:

Interviewer: "Why x?"
Subject: "Because z"
Interviewer: "Why z?"
Subject: "Because b"
Interviewer: "Why b?"

The first responses are generally functional justifications, like "I went out with my friends because I wanted some pizza", or "I wanted some pizza because I used to eat it as a child"; but eventually the interviewer hopes to reach a virtue justification like "It's good to be childish". Then it is fair to conclude that the interviewee skipped class because he valued childishness.

== History ==
=== Introduction to laddering theory ===
Thomas J. Reynolds and Jonathan Gutman were the founders and pioneers of the laddering theory. Originally, laddering came from consumer research, laddering is derivative from the Means-End Theory as proposed by Gutman. Means-End Theory states that people choose a product because it contains attributes (the means) that are instrumental in achieving the desired consequences and fulfilling values (the ends). To put it another way, consumer behaviour is dependent on how the user perceives certain product attributes, these are likely to have certain desired consequences, which are also seemingly beneficial to their individual values. This means that the common generic means-end chain consists of attributes (A), consequences (C) and values (V).

=== Usage in marketing technique ===
This technique is used for marketing in order to see what values inspire the consumption of the particular product. A chocolate bar producer would do this test so they can match the most common terminal virtue to their product in an advertisement. For example, the virtue of justice, or a virtue of efficiency, or in the above example, the virtue of childhood.

The Laddering technique allows businesses get to know their customers better by asking them simple direct questions.

=== The interview environment ===
In the beginning of the interview process, the interviewer should build good rapport with the interviewee. Making the respondent aware that they will not be judged for their right and wrong answers. By adapting this technique of environment the purpose of the laddering interview can be accomplished.

=== Two basic problems of laddering ===
Before getting into this specifics of interviewing techniques, it is important to identify the problems associated with laddering. The two most common problems are outlined below.

=== Strengths and weaknesses of laddering ===
==== Strengths ====
Some of the plus points of the laddering technique is that it provides reasoning behind certain behaviors and or choices. Laddering is a way to draw out a response or answer from someone that might not be revealed through other conventional methods.

==== Weaknesses ====
This form of technique can very be tiring and or boring for the interviewee as the same questions are asked over and over again.Method 19 of 100: Laddering Questions

Another weakness is the interviewee may find the questions very difficult and the answers can be less reliable.

=== Features of laddering in qualitative marketing ===
This process seeks to understand why goods and services are bought by people.
