= Cognitive interview =

Method of interviewing witnesses to crime

The cognitive interview (CI) is a method of interviewing eyewitnesses and victims about what they remember from a crime scene. Using four retrievals, the primary focus of the cognitive interview is to make witnesses and victims of a situation aware of all the events that transpired. The interview aids in minimizing both misinterpretation and the uncertainty that is otherwise seen in the questioning process of traditional police interviews. Cognitive interviews reliably enhance the process of memory retrieval and have been found to elicit memories without generating inaccurate accounts or confabulations. Cognitive interviews are increasingly used in police investigations, and training programs and manuals have been created.

== History ==
In 1975, the RAND Corporation completed a study on criminal-investigations. The study found that the testimony of an eyewitness was an important determinant in whether the case was solved or not. However, it has been found that many eyewitness reports were unreliable as they could be incomplete, partially constructed and vulnerable to suggestions during the interviewing process. Studies have shown that interviewing techniques such as asking leading questions and closed-ended questions can influence the responses given by the interviewee. Many of the techniques were explored by Elizabeth Loftus, a researcher who studied eyewitness testimony, the misinformation effect, and false memories.

Cognitive interviews were developed in 1984 by researchers Geiselman, Fisher and their colleagues in response to the ineffective police interviewing techniques used in the past. Their goal was to suggest methods that increased the accuracies of eyewitness testimony. They found that when participants were trained in memory retrieval techniques, the participants recalled more correct information about an event than occurred on a questionnaire. They based the techniques on four general memory retrieval rules based on the encoding specificity principle, and the assumption that memory traces are usually complex with various kinds of information. In 1985 Geiselman, Fisher and their colleagues MacKinnon and Holland further showed that the cognitive interview had ecological validity by having participants watch videos of simulated violent crimes. The original concept of the cognitive interview was revised in 1987 by Fisher, Geiselman and their colleagues. The revisions to the original cognitive interview incorporated the idea of structuring the interview to be more compatible with how the brain retrieves memories. The revised version of the cognitive interview showed an increase of 45 percent in correct information retrieved. In 1992, Fisher and Geiselman wrote a training manual for investigative services on how to conduct a cognitive interview. The techniques they developed are widely used today by a variety of investigative services such as police departments, private investigators, and attorneys.

== Memory retrieval ==
The foundation for the creation of the cognitive interview was rooted in several well researched facts about human memory. Research has shown that memory deteriorates over time. This indicates that the more time that passes between initial encoding and subsequent retrieval the less likely accurate recall will be. This could be a potential issue during a cognitive interview if a large amount of time has elapsed between witnessing the crime and subsequently conducting the interview. It has also been demonstrated that human memory has a limited capacity for storing information, as well as a reconstructive nature. The reconstructive nature of human memory can be demonstrated through the use of schemas; a memory blueprint that provides insight and guidance as to what one might expect from certain events. As a consequence, a witness may incorrectly recall and subsequently report the events of a crime because they are reporting what their schema of a crime is, as opposed to what actually transpired. It has also demonstrated that the recall of information from memory is influenced by the strategies used to gain access to that information. This information has since been integrated in the field of forgetting in eyewitness testimonies.

=== Theoretical background ===
Cognitive interviewing is rooted in two cognitive theories: the encoding specificity principle and the multi-component view of memory. The encoding specificity principle was introduced by Endel Tulving. This theory states that cues presented will be more effective in facilitating recall when the cues have some degree of similarity to cues that were present at the time of encoding. Thus, a retrieval environment that effectively reinstates the original environment should enhance memory. This demonstrates that an eyewitness will remember most about an event when there is maximal overlap between the context in which the crime was witnessed and the context in which the recall attempt is made. Based on this principle, an interviewer will receive better results using the first two retrieval rules if they are able to encourage the participant to recreate an overall environment similar to that of the event the participant had witnessed. For example, the interviewer could encourage the witness to recreate their original state (at the time of the crime) during the interview. Past research has demonstrated that memories that have been encoded during a high, emotionally aroused state may be accessible only if the same affect is reinstated during retrieval. The last two retrieval rules are based on the multi-component view of memory which maintains that memory trace is not a linear representation of the original event, but rather is a complex. As a consequence, information about an event can be retrieved using a number of different routes; each of which might provide information about rather different aspects of the original event.

=== Retrieval rules ===
The use of the cognitive interview is based on four memory retrieval rules and several supplementary techniques. These rules are referred to as mnemonics.

1. Mental Reinstatement of Environmental and Personal Contexts: The participant is asked to mentally revisit the to-be-remembered (TBR) event. The interviewer may ask them to form a mental picture of the environment in which they witnessed the event. This picture could include the placement of objects such as windows or furniture, the lighting, or even the temperature. The participant is also asked to revisit their personal mental state during the event and then describe it in detail. The purpose of this process is to increase the feature overlap between initial witnessing and subsequent retrieval contexts.
2. In-depth Reporting: The interviewer encourages the reporting of every detail, regardless of how peripheral it may seem to the main incident. This step is important for two reasons. First, the participant may only initially report what information they assume to be important regardless of the fact that they are unaware of what information will have value. Second, recalling partial details may lead to subsequent recall of additional relevant information.
3. Describing the TBR Event in Several Orders: The participant creates a narrative of the TBR event. He or she is then prompted to start the narrative from a point that is different from their initial starting point. This process may provide a new perspective of the event which subsequently provides an opportunity for new information to be recalled.
4. Reporting the TBR Event from Different Perspectives: The participant is asked to report the event from several different perspectives; like that of another witness or even a participant. If the participant witnessed a robbery, the interviewer may ask ‘What do you think the cashier saw?’ and then ask for the participant’s perspective.
5. Supplementary Techniques: These techniques are used to elicit specific items from the narrative that the participant provides about what they witnessed. These techniques are questions posed to the interviewee that may jog their memory for details such as physical appearance (‘Did the intruder remind you of anyone you know?’), objects (‘Did they appear to be heavy to carry?’), or speech characteristics (‘Were any unusual words or foreign words used?’).

Each of the four retrieval rules were tested and proved to be useful in the interview process.

=== The enhanced cognitive interview ===
The enhanced version of the cognitive interview contains the same four retrieval rules as the original. The enhanced CI includes more social aspects to the interview setting and procedure, which adds a further increase in recall from the original version. The enhanced version also includes several general principles for improving communication between the interviewer and the participant. These recommendations include minimizing any distractions, allowing for a pause between the response and the next question, as well as tailoring the language used to suit the eyewitness. These recommendations allow the interviewer to provide an environment that allows for increased context reinstatement from the participant.

== Performing a cognitive interview ==
=== Process ===
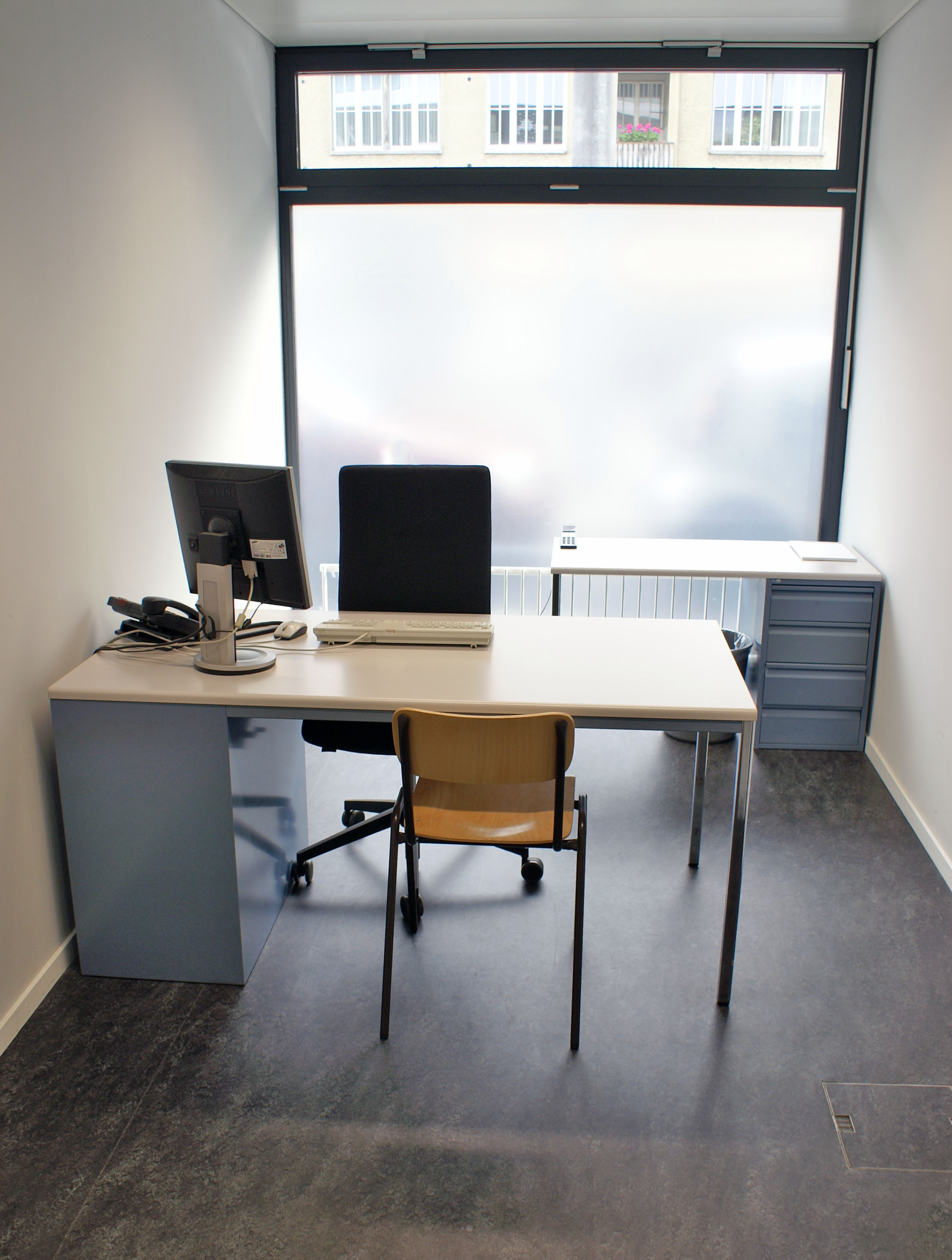
Possible setting to perform a cognitive interview

The cognitive interview is carried out in a series of several steps. First, an introduction is made which establishes a relationship between the witness and the interviewer. At this point the interviewer introduces the four retrieval rules to the witness and asks him or her to use these techniques. The interviewer then gives the witness an opportunity to provide an uninterrupted narration of what they saw. During this time, the interviewer is able to construct a strategy for carrying out the remainder of the interview. The interviewer will then guide the witness through several information-rich memory representations, after which the interviewer will assess the witness' recollections. The completion of this last step is followed by the completion of the interview. The interview is formally ended, but with a suggestion that will prolong its functional life. According to Willis, although two-hour interviews are possible the optimal length for a cognitive interview is about an hour.

=== The effective interviewer ===
One of the main goals of the interviewer is to maximize memory retrieval from a detailed level of representation and to minimize memory retrieval from the general level. In a study done by Fisher, Geiselman, and Amador several suggestions are provided for the interviewer to use when they feel appropriate in order to maximize memory retrieval.

1. Based on what is known about the encoding specificity principle, the interviewer should encourage the witness to revisit their state of mind at the time of the event. The interviewer would encourage that the witness think about any external factors (e.g., weather), emotional factors (e.g., feelings of fear), and cognitive factors (e.g., relevant thoughts) that were present.
2. The interviewer should make every effort to assist the witness to remain in a state of focused concentration because if there is any disruption, the retrieval process will be impaired.
3. To encourage the witnesses’ participation, the interviewer should use open-ended questions.
4. The series of events witnessed will be stored differently for each participant. The effective interviewer makes every effort to tailor the interview to each witness. Interviewers should be flexible and alter their approach to meet the needs of each witness rather than use a rigid, uniform style of questioning thereby forcing witnesses to adjust their mental representations to the interviewer's questioning.

== Limitations ==
Though cognitive interviews have been shown to yield many positive results, this technique is not without its limitations. The most commonly cited problem regarding cognitive interviews is that they are more difficult to perform than standard police interviews. Cognitive interviews (CI) are more difficult to conduct than standard interviews (SI) in two main ways:

1. The CI takes longer to conduct than a standard police interview.
2. Cognitive interviews are only useful with certain eyewitnesses.

Ultimately, when performing a cognitive interview it is important to develop a rapport and trust between the interviewer and eyewitness to obtain the necessary information. This relationship is integral when conducting a cognitive interview as interrogation tactics often found in standard police interviews are not used.

=== Dependence on eyewitnesses ===
The usefulness of cognitive interviews depends upon the presence of eyewitnesses at the scene of a crime. If there are no eyewitnesses or bystanders present during a crime, the use in performing a cognitive interview becomes limited to non-existent. Cognitive interviews are most effective in situations such as robberies or batteries where eyewitnesses are more likely to be present.

=== Line-up recognition ===
Research has also demonstrated that cognitive interviews are not generally effective as a form of memory-enhancement with regards to the recognition of suspects in police lineups or photo arrays. Cognitive interviewing can impair an eyewitness's ability to accurately identify a face in comparison to a standard police interview. Though this problem can be resolved by implementing a short delay of as little as 30 minutes, if interviewers are unaware of the need for a delay, the impairment caused by cognitive interviewing strategies could potentially make things unreliable.

=== Accuracy ===
Although cognitive interviews aim to increase the amount of information reported from an eyewitness, implementing this method of memory-enhancement does not necessarily guarantee accurate information. During the interview process it is not uncommon for an interviewee to succumb to a social desirability bias. This means that the witness alters their story or response in a way that they feel makes their answer more acceptable in the eyes of the interviewer as well as society. A meta-analysis indicates that accuracy is almost identical to standard interviews.

=== Children ===
Despite the fact that cognitive interviewing methods have been modified for use with children, these modifications are not equally effective across all pre-adolescent age groups. Research has demonstrated that the cognitive interview is more successful with older children than with younger children. Studies have shown that younger children have more difficulty adhering to the more advanced components of the cognitive interview. This difficulty could be due to developmental reasons. Another study showed that cognitive interviewing proved to significantly increase the amount of correct information recalled in a group of 7 to 9 year olds, however, this group's amount of confabulation also increased.

Despite the few limitations that may arise, cognitive interviewing as a whole has been an overall successful among interviewers and witnesses of a crime. Another advantage of the cognitive interview aside from its success in enhanced recall is that it can be learned and applied with a minimal amount of training. Several studies of the cognitive interview have provided results that support the effectiveness of this relatively new method of interviewing. The cognitive interview has proven to be a beneficial method for memory enhancement in police officers, children, adults and older adults when recalling the events of a mishap or crime.

== Effectiveness in different population segments ==
=== Police and interviewing ===
It has been demonstrated that cognitive interviews to be better than standard interviews. Field tests have shown that police officers trained in cognitive interviewing benefit from gathering more information from witnesses in investigative scenes. One particular study showed that more information (which the study also deemed accurate) is extracted when using cognitive interviews compared to standard police interviews.

=== Children: Age groups ===
Child participants have been able to provide interviewers with solid responses, which have proven to be both correct and detailed when given a cognitive interview. Researchers have recently reported that cognitive interviewing leads children to report detailed information that is particularly relevant to police investigations. The children demonstrate correct recall of the criminal, the crime, as well as objects and location in comparison to a controlled police interview. In one study, a modified version of the cognitive interview was deduced to ensure children fully understood the instructions of the interview as well as the questions they were being asked. They were taught to put themselves in another person’s perspective. For example, "Put yourself in the body of _________ and tell me what that person saw,". The children were made aware that they could use "I don't know" as a response. The MCI versions were found to be effective in children. Two additional studies were conducted to examine the effectiveness of the instructions used in both the cognitive interviews and of a new mnemonic, the 'cued recall' (CR), on children’s recall and suggestibility levels. In the first experiment 229 children ages 4–5 and 8-9, participated in a painting session. Afterward they were interviewed with one of the six interview protocols: A full CI, four modified versions of the CI, or a structured interview (SI). The children were then asked misleading questions. Results showed that the full CI and the variations of the CI elicited more correct details than the SI, without association in errors or confabulations, misrepresentation of events. In the second experiment 57 children were tested with a cognitive interview without the change order instruction (CO). The omission of the CO reduced children’s suggestibility level. Results confirmed the effectiveness of this protocol. Moreover, children who were tested using the CI and its four modifications, reported more correct information than children interviewed with the SI at any age. Furthermore, a study done by Geiselman and his fellow researchers found that the CI reduced the negative effects of misinformation when the witnesses were previously interviewed with a CI. This is referred to the Geiselman effect. Thus, the CI reduces suggestibility if administered before the suggestive interview.

=== Adults ===
Research involving adults and the use of the cognitive interview have found that there is accuracy in correct recall of details using the CI . In one successful study, witnesses were asked to draw a detailed sketch of what they witnessed while conversing, which proved to be as effective as asking witnesses to mentally reinstate context. Moreover, the researchers found that witnesses produced fewer confabulations when sketch was used which led to the belief that the witness’s used their own cues to help them remember rather than relying on the interviewer to direct them towards relevant cues. Therefore, cognitive retrieval is effective in enhancing eyewitness memory retrieval in the police interview. Moreover, according to Tulving and Thomson’s encoding specificity principle, context reinstatement increases the availability of memory-stored information and studies have found the connection between the role played by the CI and this principle. Another study sought out to compare the effectiveness of three interview procedures for optimizing witness memory performance. The cognitive interview, hypnosis interview and standard police interview were used. The results found that both cognitive and hypnosis interviews elicited significantly greater numbers of correct items of information than the standard police interview throughout all instances of the study. The results of the cognitive interview closely replicate those obtained by Geiselman et al. (1984), in which participants were interviewed about a classroom intrusion using a structured questionnaire. Again, more correct items of information were generated with the cognitive interview than with the control interview, and without an increase in the number of incorrect items. Thus, the cognitive interview is capable of enhancing eyewitness memory performance both under conditions of experimental control as well as under conditions of high ecological validity.

=== Older adults ===
It is important to address the cognitive interview and senior citizens. Seniors are more likely to be active and engaged in the community, as well as more likely to come into contact with law enforcement. Studies have confirmed that older adults benefit even more from the CI than younger adults in providing precise details of an incident. These benefits in more correct details seen in older adult witnesses are reliable with the environmental support hypothesis, which predicts that older adults rely more on and make more effective use of, external support at the time of remembering due to reduced cognitive resources that are needed to initiate their own retrieval strategies.
