= Vignette (psychology) =

Situation used in studies

A vignette in psychological and sociological experiments presents a hypothetical situation, to which research participants respond thereby revealing their perceptions, values, social norms or impressions of events.

Peter Rossi and colleagues developed a framework for creating vignettes by systematically combining predictor variables in order to dissect the effects of the variables on dependent variables. For example, to study normative judgments of family status, "there might be 10 levels of income; 50 head-of-household occupations, and 50 occupations for spouses; two races, white and black; and ten levels of family size". Since this approach can lead to huge universes of stimuli – half a million in the example – Rossi proposed drawing small random samples from the universe of stimuli for presentation to individual respondents, and pooling judgments by multiple respondents in order to sample the universe adequately. Main effects of predictor variables then can be assessed, though not all interactive effects.

Vignettes in the form of sentences describing actions have been used extensively to estimate impression formation equations in research related to affect control theory. In this case, different respondents are presented with each sentence, and some are asked to rate how the actor seems during the event, others rate the object of action, and other respondents rate how the overall action makes the behavior seem. Subgroups of respondents receive different sets of event sentences, and the subgroup data are pooled for final analyses.

Vignettes enable controlled studies of mental processes that would be difficult or impossible to study through observation or classical experiments. However, an obvious disadvantage of this method is that reading a vignette is different from experiencing a stimulus or action in everyday life.

== See also ==
- Vignette (survey)
