= Vignette (survey) =

Example method

A vignette is a short description of one or more hypothetical characters or situation. They are used in quantitative surveys or in qualitative studies that pretest surveys.

Survey researchers use anchoring vignettes to correct interpersonally incomparable survey responses because respondents from different cultures, genders, countries, or ethnic groups understand survey questions in different ways. Vignette wordings are experimentally controlled, and different versions of the vignette may be randomly assigned to different survey respondents who are then asked close-ended questions to rate their reactions.

Vignettes are also used as part of cognitive interviewing and focus groups, or in conjunction with respondent debriefing to pretest survey questions by examining the participants' survey-relevant decisions. They allow researchers to test multiple situations while minimizing the challenge of recruiting participants who correspond to each specific situation. After presenting the vignette, participants are probed for their interpretation of terms and their thought process with regard to the survey questions.
