= Structured interview =

Survey research method

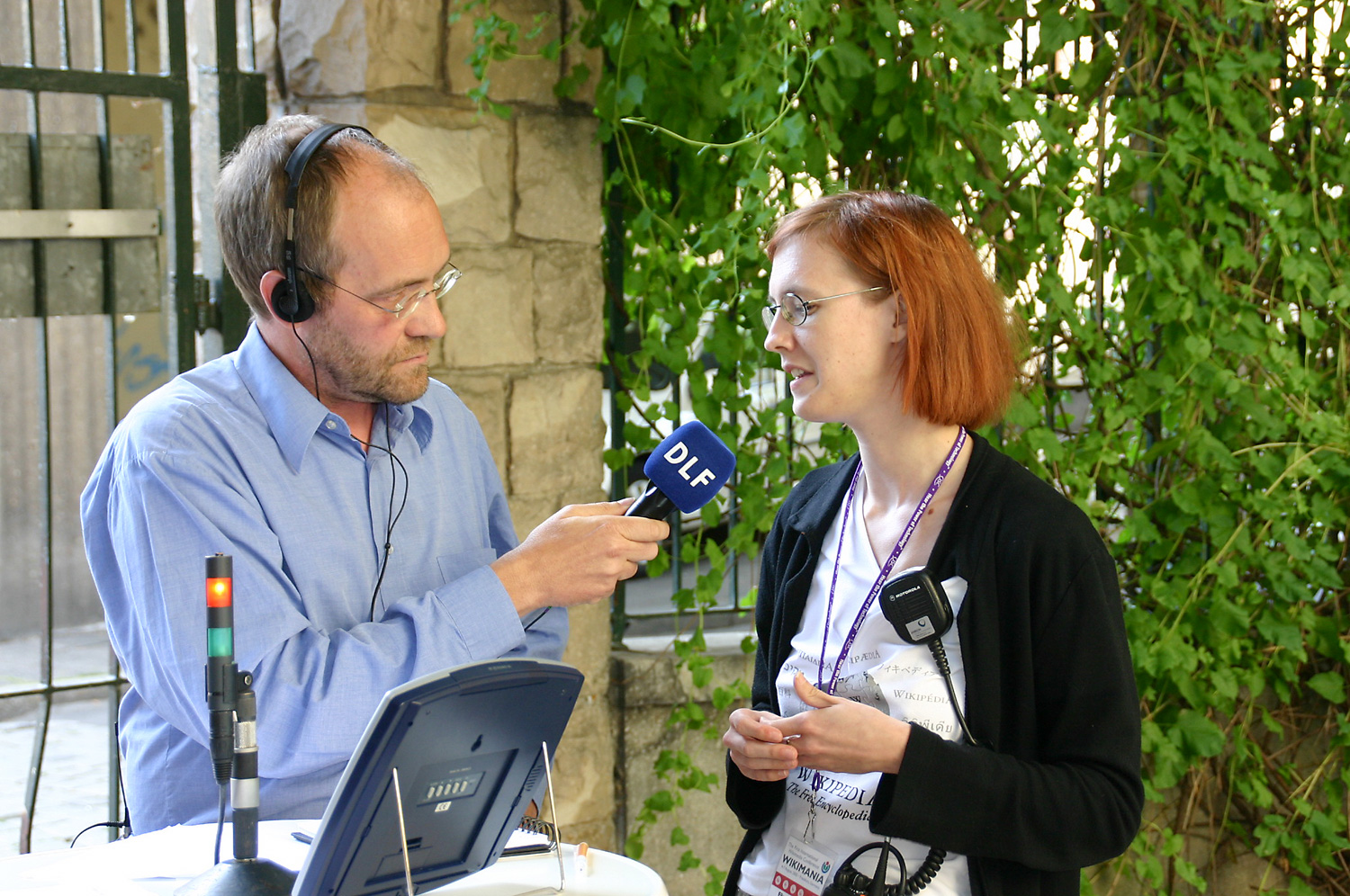
Interviewer conducting a face-to-face interview with a participant.

A structured interview (also known as a standardized interview or a researcher-administered survey) is a quantitative research method commonly employed in survey research. The aim of this approach is to ensure that each interview is presented with exactly the same questions in the same order. This ensures that answers can be reliably aggregated and that comparisons can be made with confidence between sample sub groups or between different survey periods.

== Structure ==
Structured interviews are a means of collecting data for a statistical survey. In this case, the data is collected by an interviewer rather than through a self-administered questionnaire. Interviewers read the questions exactly as they appear on the survey questionnaire. The choice of answers to the questions is often fixed (close-ended) in advance, though open-ended questions can also be included within a structured interview.

A structured interview also standardises the order in which questions are asked of survey respondents, so the questions are always answered within the same context. This is important for minimising the impact of context effects, where the answers given to a survey question can depend on the nature of preceding questions. Though context effects can never be avoided, it is often desirable to hold them constant across all respondents. By doing so, structured interviews often have increased validity.

== Other uses ==
=== Qualitative research ===
Structured interviews can also be used as a qualitative research methodology. For structured qualitative interviews, it is usually necessary for researchers to develop an interview schedule which lists the wording and sequencing of questions. Interview schedules are sometimes considered a means by which researchers can increase the reliability and credibility of research data.

=== Hiring ===
Structured interviews have been advocated for use in the hiring process as well. Structured interviews have been found to provide better hiring decisions as they are more accurate and objective. The United States Postal Service uses structured interviews for at least some of its hiring, and has printed a guide to structured interviews that is publicly available online. Also Google started them too after data-driven research found it to be beneficial over more common unstructured interviews.
