= Causality (disambiguation) =

Causality is the influence that connects one process or state, the cause, with another process or state, the effect, where the cause is partly responsible for the effect, and the effect is partly dependent on the cause.

Causality may also refer to:

== Economics ==
- Granger causality, a statistical hypothesis test
- Causal layered analysis, a technique used in strategic planning and futures studies

== Philosophy ==
- Causal determinism
- Causal theory of reference
- Causalism
- Causality (philosophy)
- Fallacy of the single cause
- Humean definition of causality
- Universal causation, the proposition that everything in the universe has a cause and is thus an effect of that cause

== Science and engineering ==
- Causality (physics)
- Causal sets
- Causal dynamical triangulation
- Causal filter
- Causal perturbation theory
- Causal system
- Causality loop
- Causal structure

== Other uses ==
- Causality (middleware platform), a middleware platform developed by Clever Guerrilla Inc. for toys-to-life video game features
- Causal-final case, a grammatical case in Hungarian and Chuvash
- Causal loop diagram, infographics concept
- Causal Markov condition, in mathematics
- Causality (book), a 2009 book by Judea Pearl
- Causality (video game), 2017 video game by Loju

== See also ==
- Casualty (disambiguation)
- Causation (disambiguation)
- Cause and effect (disambiguation)
- Cause (disambiguation)
