= The Cause =

The Cause may refer to:

- The American Revolution
- A euphemism for Irish republicanism
- A euphemism for Confederate secession during the American Civil War
- A euphemism for loyalism in Ireland
- A euphemism for anarchy
- A euphemism for Palestinian political violence
- "The Cause", a song by NOFX from the album Punk in Drublic
- The Cause (London), a music venue

== See also ==
- Cause (disambiguation)
