= Causal action =

Causal action may refer to:

- Causation (disambiguation)
- The causal action principle
