= Death =

End of an organism's life

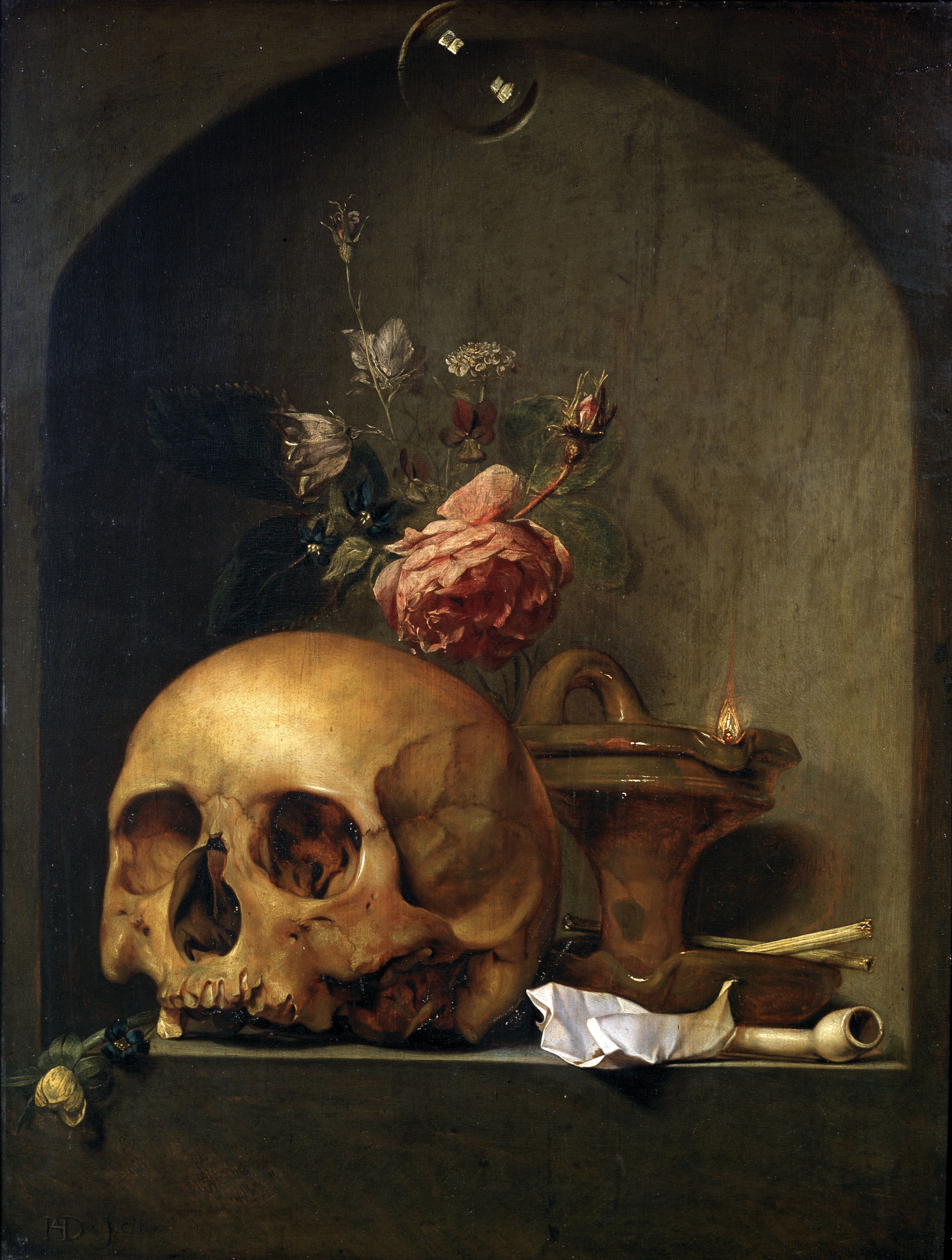
The human skull is used universally as a symbol of death.

Death is the end of an organism's life. It is the irreversible cessation of biological functions that sustain a living organism. Entropy, nature's tendency toward disorder, can contribute to the breakdown of living systems over time. Upon death, organisms stop exhibiting behavior and generally begin to decompose through various physical and chemical processes. Death can occur at any stage of development, including in infancy. A person may experience clinical death that is reversible, resulting in some cases in a near-death experience. In humans, establishing death of the brain determines that an individual has irreversibly died.

Natural selection of organisms which successfully pass on their genes to the next generation drives life to engage in a struggle for existence against death. Because of this, living things, including humans, normally fear death and have strong instincts to avoid it. Some organisms may kill other organisms, causing them to die through herbivory, predation, or parasitism in order to take resources from the bodies of other organisms into their own. Organisms can also kill others through competition, in which they struggle with each other for control of external resources. Sometimes, organisms will take resources from organisms which have already died, either through scavenging or decomposition. However, despite the widespread instinct to survive, sometimes animals may commit suicide, being intentionally self-caused death, which in humans may be attributed to a variety of risk factors including mental illness. Besides intentional killing, organisms can die due to failure to secure necessary resources such as starvation or dehydration, or through harmful physical factors such as natural disasters or diseases. Organisms that do not die for these reasons usually succumb to death from old age; however, some organisms, such as the immortal jellyfish, are biologically immortal while still being able to die from other causes. Organisms have varying life histories, with differing life spans between species. Death affects populations of organisms, with selective pressures resulting in organisms with traits that are unfavorable in a given environment to die off; changes to an environment such as climate change or invasive species can cause entire ecosystems to die at higher rates than usual. As opposed to intentional suicide, sometimes species will commit evolutionary suicide in which existing adaptations lead to the deaths of all of their members. When all individuals of a clade have died, that clade is said to be extinct. Extinction events are periods of time when rates of extinction on Earth result in global loss of biodiversity due to mass death within many species worldwide.

As human beings have evolved the mental faculties to be aware of death, knowledge of death is a central part of the human condition and therefore is universal to human culture. Knowledge of death has motivated the development of a variety of religious, spiritual, ethical, and legal methods for understanding and responding to it. Many cultures have a concept of the survival of individuals after death, whether in an afterlife, as spirits, or through reincarnation. While such dualistic notions of survival past death are common to the world's major religions, other monist forms of thought such as materialism and physicalism generally maintain that death is the irreversible end of personal identity. Some societies have taboos on the dead, whereby information about a person who has died is censored. To avoid death, people have sometimes sought to achieve immortality, or eternal life, such as through cryogenics. Once a person has died, their community will generally perform funerary rituals to process the cadaver and honor the decedent according to practices specific to their culture. If a person is understood to have most likely died without direct evidence, they can be legally declared dead in absentia in many countries. Surviving people close to a decedent normally experience grief, a set of powerful mental and emotional processes associated with the loss of the person. For a human being to kill another is called homicide, an act that has profound legal implications in most societies. Homicide considered unjustified is known as murder, and is generally considered one of the most serious crimes in any society. However, states claim a monopoly on violence by which they may legally kill people, whether as punishment for crimes, through police violence, or through war. The study of death is known as thanatology.

== Background ==
Annual deaths per 1,000 people

Annual death rate from all causes

Leading cause of death

As of the early 21st century, 56 million people die per year. As of 2022, an estimated total of almost 110 billion humans have died, or roughly 94% of all humans to have ever lived. The cause of death is usually considered important, and an autopsy can be done to determine it. There are many causes, from accidents to diseases or crime and war. The most common reason is aging; the most common cause is cardiovascular disease (CVD), which is a disease that affects the heart or blood vessels. A substudy of gerontology known as biogerontology seeks to eliminate death by natural aging in humans, often through the application of natural processes found in certain organisms. However, as humans do not have the means to apply this to themselves, they have to use other ways to reach the maximum lifespan for a human, often through lifestyle changes, such as calorie reduction, dieting, and exercise. The idea of lifespan extension is considered and studied as a way for people to live longer.

Determining when a person has definitively died has proven difficult. Initially, death was defined as occurring when breathing and the heartbeat ceased, a status still known as clinical death. However, the development of cardiopulmonary resuscitation (CPR) meant that such a state was no longer strictly irreversible. For all organisms with a brain, death can instead be focused on this organ. Brain death was then considered a more fitting option, but several definitions exist for this: some people believe that all brain functions must cease; others believe that even if the brainstem is still alive, the personality and identity are irretrievably lost, so therefore the person should be considered entirely dead. Brain death is sometimes used as a legal definition of death.

There are different customs for honoring the lifeless body, such as a funeral, cremation, or sky burial. After a death, an obituary may be posted in a newspaper, and the family and friends of the dead person usually go through the grieving process.

== Definition ==
There are many scientific approaches and various interpretations of the concept. Additionally, the advent of life-sustaining therapy and the numerous criteria for defining death from both a medical and legal standpoint have made it difficult to create a single unifying definition.

=== Defining life to define death ===
One of the challenges in defining death is in distinguishing it from life. As a point in time, death seems to refer to the moment when life ends. Determining when death has occurred is difficult, as cessation of life functions is often not simultaneous across organ systems. Such determination, therefore, requires drawing precise conceptual boundaries between life and death. This is difficult due to there being little consensus on how to define life.

It is possible to define life in terms of consciousness. When consciousness ceases, an organism can be said to have died. One of the flaws in this approach is that there are many organisms that are alive but probably not conscious. Another problem is in defining consciousness, which has many different definitions given by modern scientists, psychologists and philosophers. Additionally, many religious traditions, including Abrahamic and Dharmic traditions, hold that death does not (or may not) entail the end of consciousness. In certain cultures, death is more of a process than a single event. It implies a slow shift from one spiritual state to another.

Other definitions for death focus on the character of cessation of organismic functioning and human death, which refers to irreversible loss of personhood. More specifically, death occurs when a living entity experiences irreversible cessation of all functioning. As it pertains to human life, death is an irreversible process where someone loses their existence as a person.

=== Definition of death by heartbeat and breath ===
Historically, attempts to define the exact moment of a human's death have been subjective or imprecise. Death was defined as the cessation of heartbeat (cardiac arrest) and breathing, but the development of CPR and prompt defibrillation have rendered that definition inadequate because breathing and heartbeat can sometimes be restarted. This type of death where circulatory and respiratory arrest happens is known as the circulatory definition of death (CDD). Proponents of the CDD believe this definition is reasonable because a person with permanent loss of circulatory and respiratory function should be considered dead. Critics of this definition state that while cessation of these functions may be permanent, it does not mean the situation is irreversible because if CPR is applied fast enough, the person could be revived. Thus, the arguments for and against the CDD boil down to defining the actual words "permanent" and "irreversible," which further complicates the challenge of defining death. Furthermore, events causally linked to death in the past no longer kill in all circumstances; without a functioning heart or lungs, life can sometimes be sustained with a combination of life support devices, organ transplants, and artificial pacemakers.

=== Brain death ===
Today, where a definition of the moment of death is required, doctors and coroners usually turn to "brain death" or "biological death" to define a person as being dead; people are considered dead when the electrical activity in their brain ceases. It is presumed that an end of electrical activity indicates the end of consciousness. Suspension of consciousness must be permanent and not transient, as occurs during certain sleep stages, and especially a coma. In the case of sleep, electroencephalograms (EEGs) are used to tell the difference.

The category of "brain death" is seen as problematic by some scholars. For instance, Dr. Franklin Miller, a senior faculty member at the Department of Bioethics, National Institutes of Health, notes: "By the late 1990s... the equation of brain death with death of the human being was increasingly challenged by scholars, based on evidence regarding the array of biological functioning displayed by patients correctly diagnosed as having this condition who were maintained on mechanical ventilation for substantial periods of time. These patients maintained the ability to sustain circulation and respiration, control temperature, excrete wastes, heal wounds, fight infections and, most dramatically, to gestate fetuses (in the case of pregnant "brain-dead" women)."

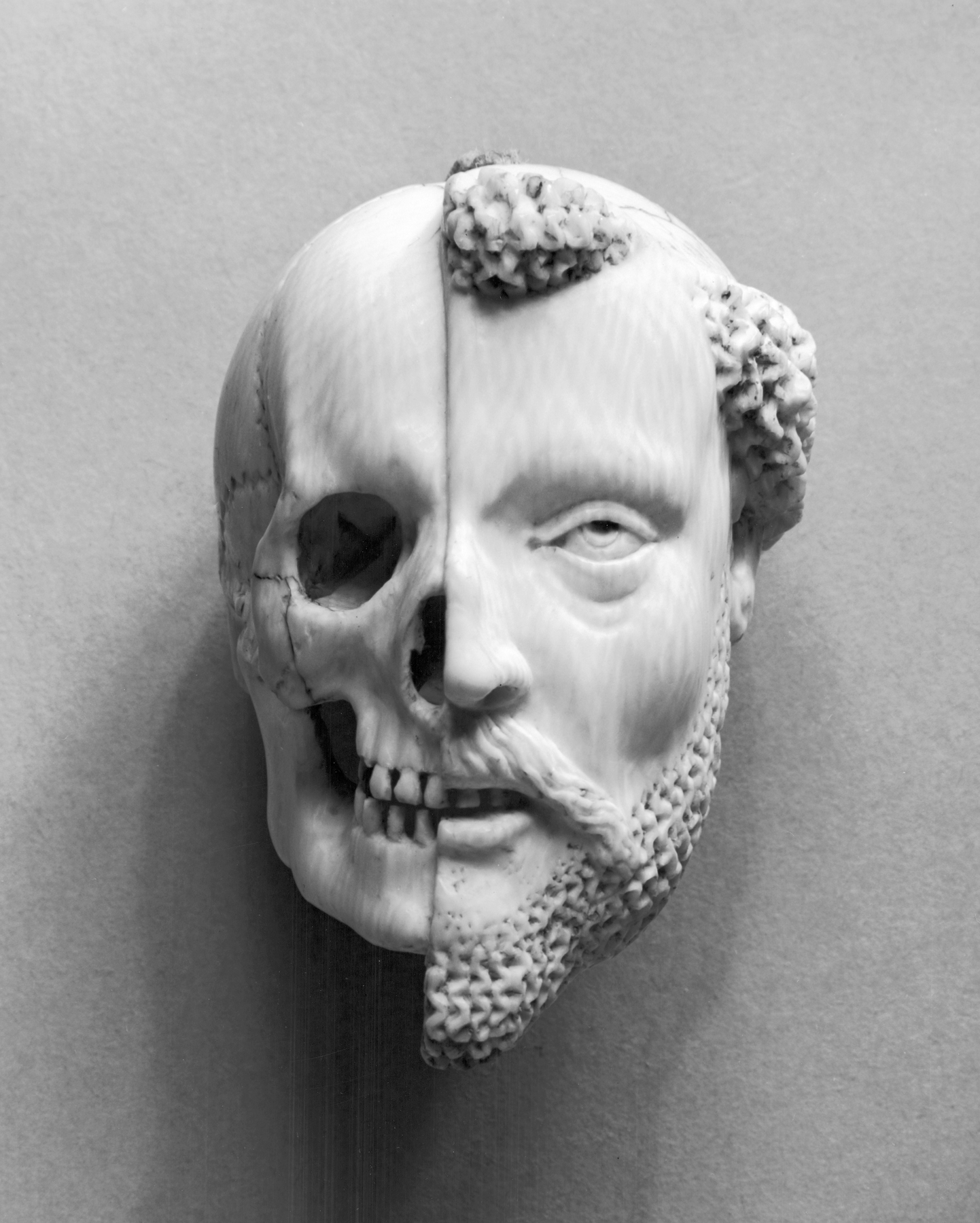
French 16th-/17th-century ivory pendant, Monk and Death, recalling mortality and the certainty of death (Walters Art Museum)

While "brain death" is viewed as problematic by some scholars, there are proponents of it that believe this definition of death is the most reasonable for distinguishing life from death. The reasoning behind the support for this definition is that brain death has a set of criteria that is reliable and reproducible. Also, the brain is crucial in determining our identity or who we are as human beings. The distinction should be made that "brain death" cannot be equated with one in a vegetative state or coma, in that the former situation describes a state that is beyond recovery.

EEGs can detect spurious electrical impulses, while certain drugs, hypoglycemia, hypoxia, or hypothermia can suppress or even stop brain activity temporarily; because of this, hospitals have protocols for determining brain death involving EEGs at widely separated intervals under defined conditions.

==== Neocortical brain death ====
One view is that the neocortex of the brain is necessary for consciousness, and that therefore only electrical activity of the neocortex should be considered when defining death. Eventually, the criterion for death may be the permanent and irreversible loss of cognitive function, as evidenced by the death of the cerebral cortex. All hope of recovering human thought and personality is then gone, given current and foreseeable medical technology. Even by whole-brain criteria, the determination of brain death can be complicated.

==== Total brain death ====
There is a more conservative definition of death: irreversible cessation of all functions of the whole brain, as opposed to just in the neo-cortex.

==== United States ====
One example is the Uniform Determination Of Death Act in the United States. In the past, the adoption of this whole-brain definition was a conclusion of the President's Commission for the Study of Ethical Problems in Medicine and Biomedical and Behavioral Research in 1980. They concluded that this approach to defining death sufficed in reaching a uniform definition nationwide. A multitude of reasons was presented to support this definition, including uniformity of standards in law for establishing death, consumption of a family's fiscal resources for artificial life support, and legal establishment for equating brain death with death to proceed with organ donation.

=== Problems in medical practice ===
Aside from the issue of support of or dispute against brain death, there is another inherent problem in this categorical definition: the variability of its application in medical practice. In 1995, the American Academy of Neurology (AAN) established the criteria that became the medical standard for diagnosing neurologic death. At that time, three clinical features had to be satisfied to determine "irreversible cessation" of the total brain, including coma with clear etiology, cessation of breathing, and lack of brainstem reflexes. These criteria were updated again, most recently in 2010, but substantial discrepancies remain across hospitals and medical specialties.

== Legal issues ==
The death of a person has legal consequences that may vary between jurisdictions. Most countries follow the whole-brain death criteria, where all functions of the brain must have completely ceased. However, in other jurisdictions, some follow the brainstem version of brain death. Afterward, a death certificate is issued in most jurisdictions, either by a doctor or by an administrative office, upon presentation of a doctor's declaration of death.

=== Donations ===
The problem of defining death is especially imperative as it pertains to the dead donor rule, which could be understood as one of the following interpretations of the rule: there must be an official declaration of death in a person before starting organ procurement, or that organ procurement cannot result in the death of the donor. A great deal of controversy has surrounded the definition of death and the dead donor rule. Advocates of the rule believe that the rule is legitimate in protecting organ donors while also countering any moral or legal objection to organ procurement. Critics, on the other hand, believe that the rule does not uphold the best interests of the donors and that the rule does not effectively promote organ donation.

== Signs ==
Signs of death or strong indications that a warm-blooded animal is no longer alive are:

- Respiratory arrest (no breathing)
- Cardiac arrest (no pulse)
- Brain death (no neuronal activity)

The stages that follow after death are:

- Pallor mortis, paleness which happens in 15–120 minutes after death
- Livor mortis, a settling of the blood in the lower (dependent) portion of the body
- Algor mortis, the reduction in body temperature following death. This is generally a steady decline until matching ambient temperature
- Rigor mortis, the limbs of the corpse become stiff (Latin rigor) and difficult to move or manipulate
- Putrefaction, the beginning signs of decomposition
- Decomposition, the reduction into simpler forms of matter, accompanied by a strong, unpleasant odor.
- Skeletonization, the end of decomposition, where all soft tissues have decomposed, leaving only the skeleton.
- Fossilization, the natural preservation of the skeletal remains formed over a very long period

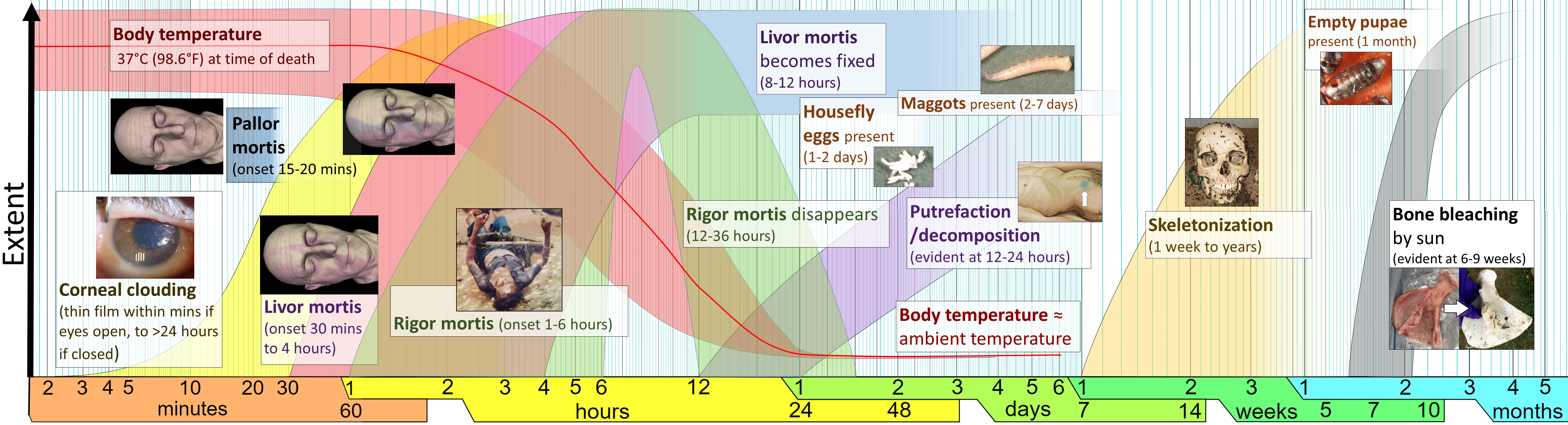
Timeline of postmortem changes (stages of death)

== Causes ==
The leading cause of human death in developing countries is infectious disease. The leading causes in developed countries are atherosclerosis (heart disease and stroke), cancer, and other diseases related to obesity and aging. By an extremely wide margin, the largest unifying cause of death in the developed world is biological aging, leading to various complications known as aging-associated diseases. These conditions cause loss of homeostasis, leading to cardiac arrest, causing loss of oxygen and nutrient supply, causing irreversible deterioration of the brain and other tissues. Of the roughly 150,000 people who die each day across the globe, about two thirds die of age-related causes. In industrialized nations, the proportion is much higher, approaching 90%. With improved medical capability, dying has become a condition to be managed.

In developing nations, inferior sanitary conditions and lack of access to modern medical technology make death from infectious diseases more common than in developed countries. One such disease is tuberculosis, a bacterial disease that killed 1.8 million people in 2015. In 2004, malaria caused about 2.7 million deaths annually. The AIDS death toll in Africa may reach 90–100 million by 2025.

According to Jean Ziegler, the United Nations Special Reporter on the Right to Food from 2000 to March 2008, mortality due to malnutrition accounted for 58% of the total mortality rate in 2006. Ziegler says worldwide, approximately 62 million people died from all causes and of those deaths, more than 36 million died of hunger or diseases due to deficiencies in micronutrients.

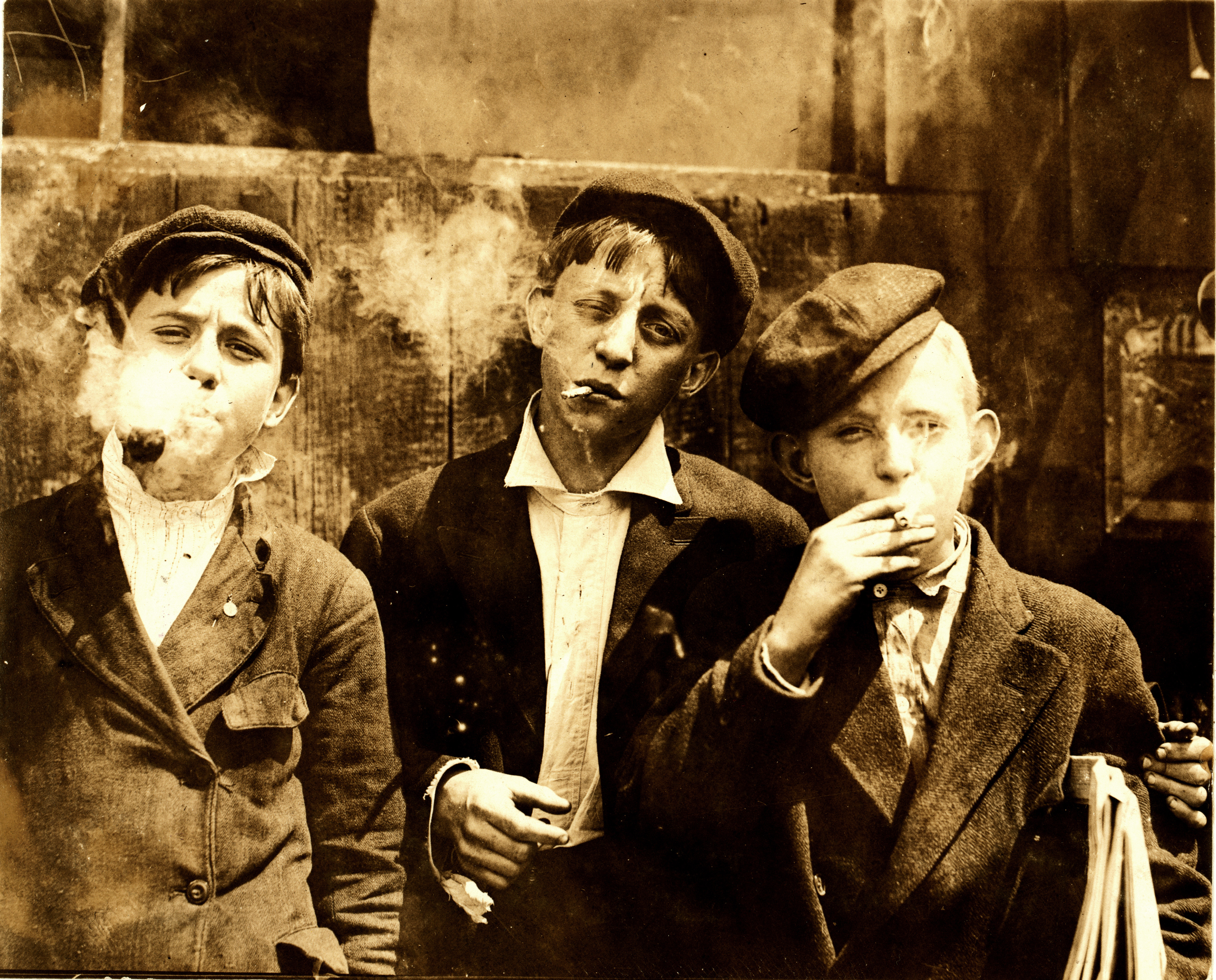
American children smoking in 1910. Tobacco smoking caused an estimated 100 million deaths in the 20th century.

Tobacco smoking killed 100 million people worldwide in the 20th century and could kill 1 billion people worldwide in the 21st century, a World Health Organization report warned.

Many leading developed world causes of death can be postponed by diet and physical activity, but the accelerating incidence of disease with age still imposes limits on human longevity. The evolutionary cause of aging is, at best, only beginning to be understood. It has been suggested that direct intervention in the aging process may now be the most effective intervention against major causes of death.

Selye proposed a unified non-specific approach to many causes of death. He demonstrated that stress decreases the adaptability of an organism and proposed to describe adaptability as a special resource in itself, adaptation energy. The animal dies when this resource is exhausted. Selye assumed that adaptability is a finite supply presented at birth. But later, Goldstone proposed the concept of production or income of adaptation energy which may be stored (up to a limit) as a capital reserve of adaptation. In recent works, adaptation energy is considered an internal coordinate on the "dominant path" in the model of adaptation. It is demonstrated that oscillations of well-being appear when the reserve of adaptability is almost exhausted.

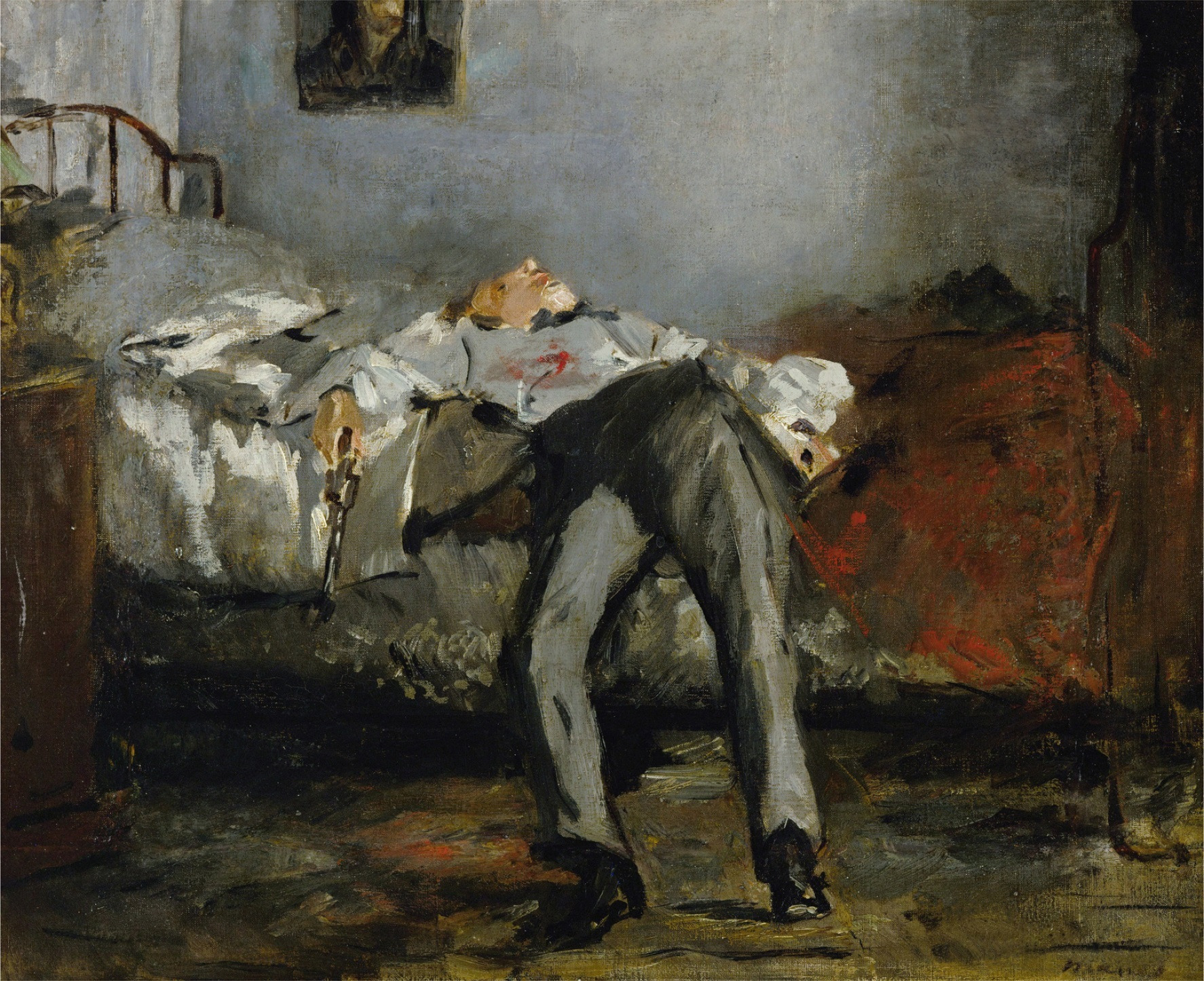
Le Suicidé by Édouard Manet

In 2012, suicide overtook car crashes as the leading cause of human injury deaths in the U.S., followed by poisoning, falls, and murder.

Accidents and disasters, from nuclear disasters to structural collapses, also claim lives. One of the deadliest incidents of all time is the 1975 Banqiao Dam Failure, with varying estimates, up to 240,000 dead. Other incidents with high death tolls are the Wanggongchang explosion (when a gunpowder factory ended up with 20,000 deaths), a collapse of a wall of Circus Maximus that killed 13,000 people, and the Chernobyl disaster that killed between 95 and 4,000 people.

Natural disasters kill around 45,000 people annually, although this number can vary from thousands to millions on a per-decade basis. Some of the deadliest natural disasters are the 1931 China floods, which killed an estimated 4 million people, although estimates widely vary; the 1887 Yellow River flood, which killed an estimated 2 million people in China; and the 1970 Bhola cyclone, which killed as many as 500,000 people in East Pakistan (present-day Bangladesh). If naturally occurring famines are considered natural disasters, the Chinese famine of 1906–1907, which killed 15–20 million people, can be considered the deadliest natural disaster in recorded history.

In animals, predation can be a common cause of death. Livestock have a 6% death rate from predation. However, younger animals are more susceptible to predation. For example, 50% of young foxes die to birds, bobcats, coyotes, and other foxes as well. Young bear cubs in the Yellowstone National Park only have a 40% chance to survive to adulthood from other bears and predators.

=== Autopsy ===
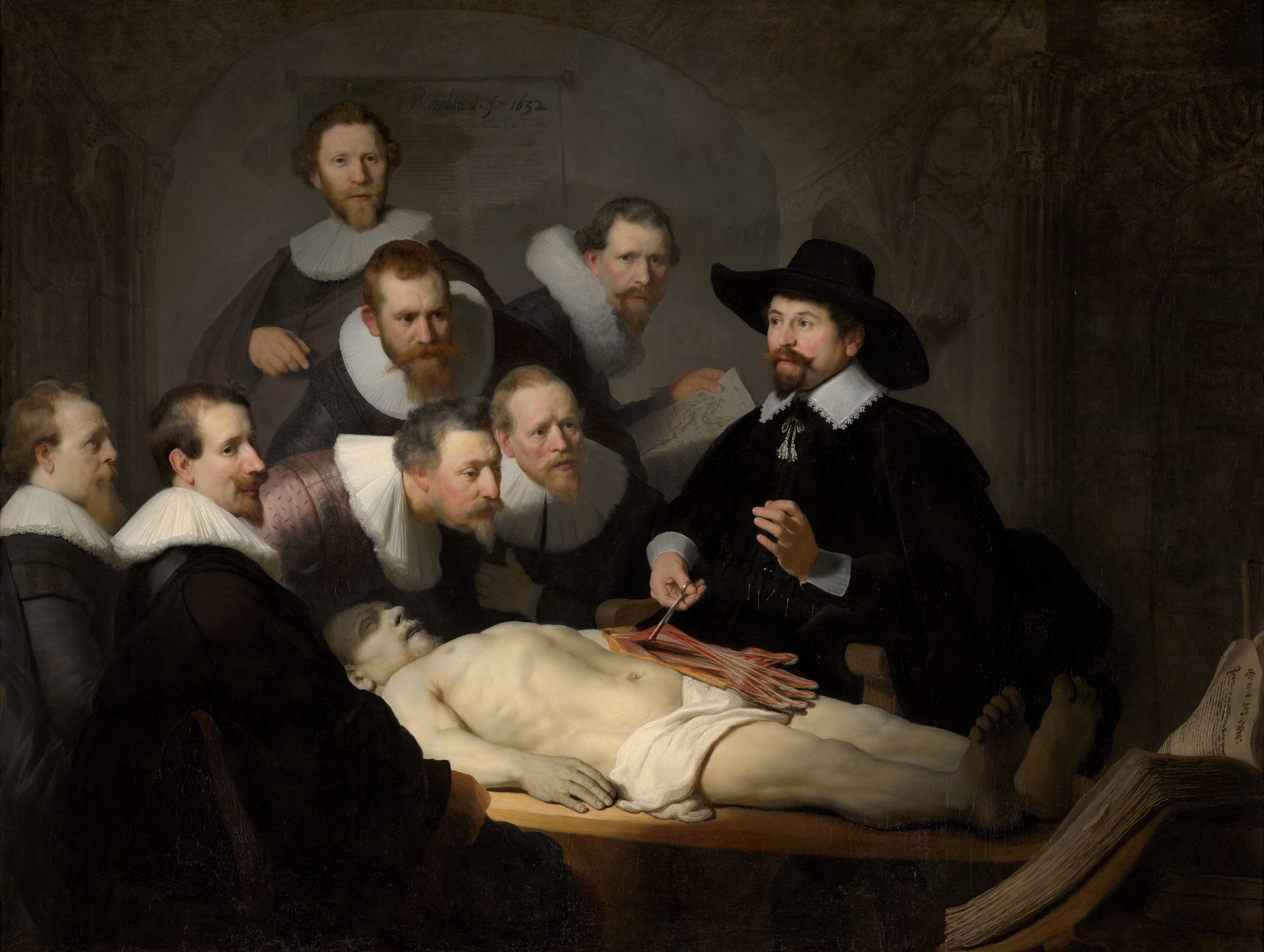
The Anatomy Lesson of Dr. Nicolaes Tulp by Rembrandt

An autopsy, also known as a postmortem examination or an obduction, is a medical procedure that consists of a thorough examination of a human corpse to determine the cause and manner of a person's death and to evaluate any disease or injury that may be present. It is usually performed by a specialized medical doctor called a pathologist.

Autopsies are either performed for legal or medical purposes. A forensic autopsy is carried out when the cause of death may be a criminal matter, while a clinical or academic autopsy is performed to find the medical cause of death and is used in cases of unknown or uncertain death, or for research purposes. Autopsies can be further classified into cases where external examination suffices, and those where the body is dissected and an internal examination is conducted. Permission from next of kin may be required for internal autopsy in some cases. Once an internal autopsy is complete the body is generally reconstituted by sewing it back together.

A necropsy, which is not always a medical procedure, was a term previously used to describe an unregulated postmortem examination. In modern times, this term is more commonly associated with the corpses of animals.

== Misdiagnosis ==
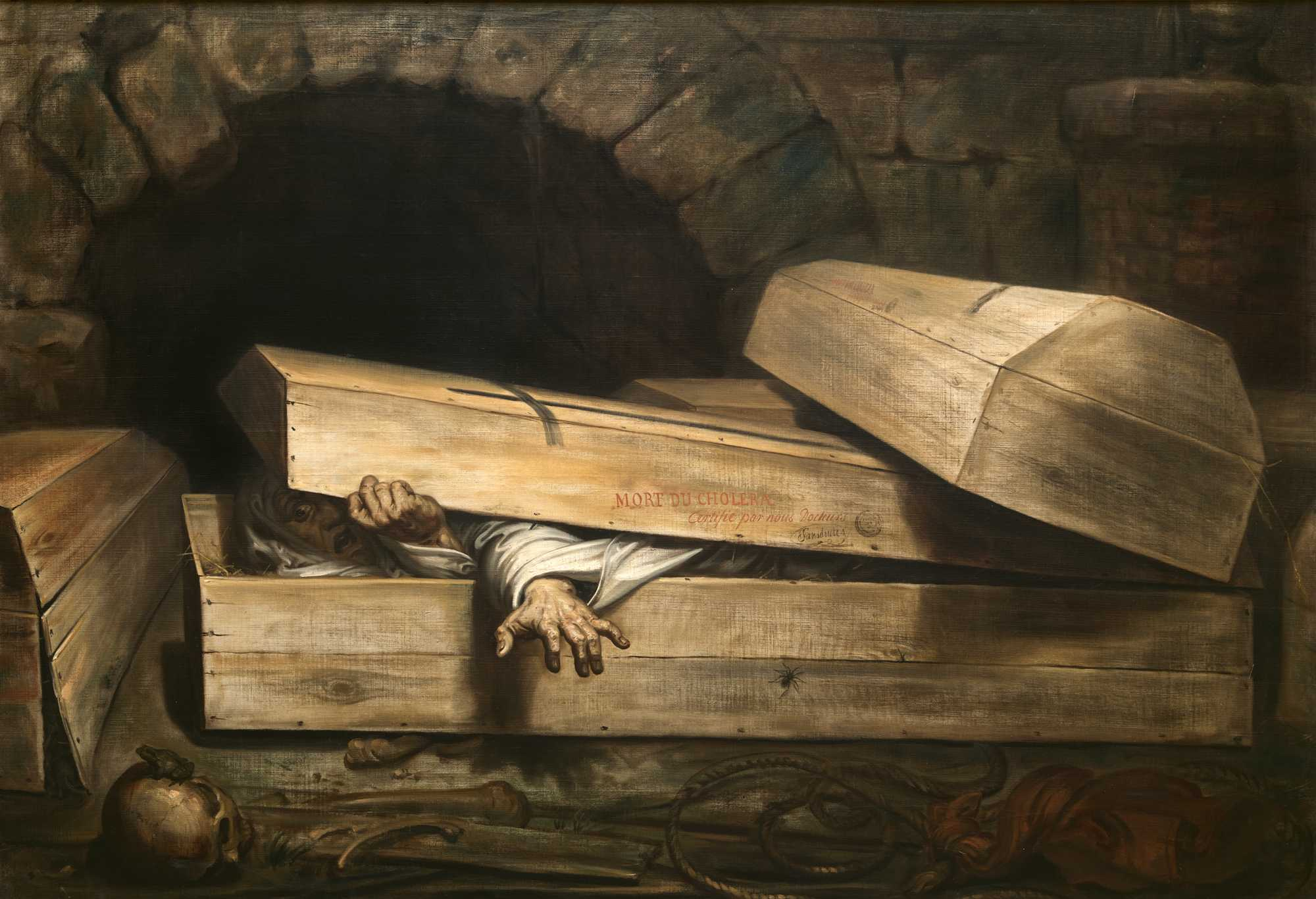
The Premature Burial by Antoine Wiertz, 1854

There are many anecdotal references to people being declared dead by physicians and then "coming back to life," sometimes days later in their coffin or when embalming procedures are about to begin. From the mid-18th century onwards, there was an upsurge in the public's fear of being mistakenly buried alive and much debate about the uncertainty of the signs of death. Various suggestions were made to test for signs of life before burial, ranging from pouring vinegar and pepper into the corpse's mouth to applying red hot pokers to the feet or into the rectum. Writing in 1895, the physician J.C. Ouseley claimed that as many as 2,700 people were buried prematurely each year in England and Wales, although some estimates peg the figure to be closer to 800.

In cases of electric shock, cardiopulmonary resuscitation (CPR) for an hour or longer can allow stunned nerves to recover, allowing an apparently dead person to survive. People found unconscious under icy water may survive if their faces are kept continuously cold until they arrive at an emergency room. This "diving response," in which metabolic activity and oxygen requirements are minimal, is something humans share with cetaceans called the mammalian diving reflex.

As medical technologies advance, ideas about when death occurs may have to be reevaluated in light of the ability to restore a person to vitality after longer periods of apparent death (as happened when CPR and defibrillation showed that cessation of heartbeat is inadequate as a decisive indicator of death). The lack of electrical brain activity may not be enough to consider someone scientifically dead. Therefore, the concept of information-theoretic death has been suggested as a better means of defining when true death occurs, though the concept has few practical applications outside the field of cryonics.

== Death before birth ==
Death before birth can happen in several ways: stillbirth, when the fetus dies before or during the delivery process; miscarriage, when the embryo dies before independent survival; and abortion, the artificial termination of the pregnancy. Stillbirth and miscarriage can happen for various reasons, while abortion is carried out purposely.

=== Stillbirth ===
Stillbirth can happen right before or after the delivery of a fetus. It can result from defects of the fetus or risk factors present in the mother. Reductions of these factors, caesarean sections when risks are present, and early detection of birth defects have lowered the rate of stillbirth. However, 1% of births in the United States end in a stillbirth.

=== Miscarriage ===
A miscarriage is defined by the World Health Organization as, "The expulsion or extraction from its mother of an embryo or fetus weighing 500g or less." Miscarriage is one of the most frequent problems in pregnancy, and is reported in around 12–15% of all clinical pregnancies; however, by including pregnancy losses during menstruation, it could be up to 17–22% of all pregnancies. There are many risk-factors involved in miscarriage; consumption of caffeine, tobacco, alcohol, drugs, having a previous miscarriage, and the use of abortion can increase the chances of having a miscarriage.

=== Abortion ===
An abortion may be performed for many reasons, such as pregnancy from rape, financial constraints of having a child, teenage pregnancy, and the lack of support from a significant other. There are two forms of abortion: a medical abortion and an in-clinic abortion or sometimes referred to as a surgical abortion. A medical abortion involves taking a pill that will terminate the pregnancy no more than 11 weeks past the last period, and an in-clinic abortion involves a medical procedure using suction to empty the uterus; this is possible after 12 weeks, but it may be more difficult to find an operating doctor who will go through with the procedure.

== Related issues ==
=== Senescence ===
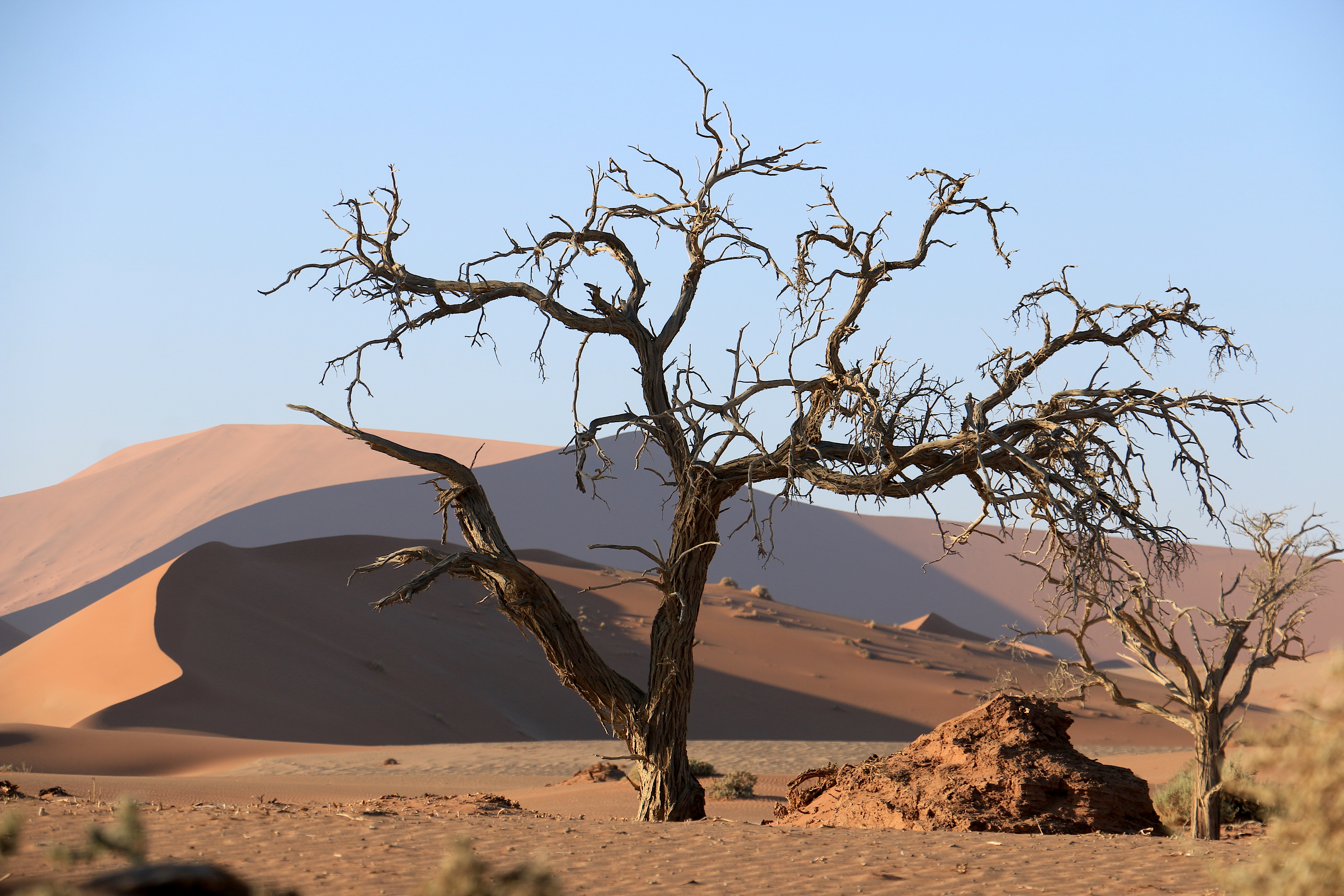
Dead camel thorn tree within Sossusvlei

Senescence refers to a scenario when a living being can survive all calamities but eventually dies due to causes relating to old age. Conversely, premature death can refer to a death that occurs before old age arrives, for example, human death before a person reaches the age of 75. Animal and plant cells normally reproduce and function during the whole period of natural existence, but the aging process derives from the deterioration of cellular activity and the ruination of regular functioning. The aptitude of cells for gradual deterioration and mortality means that cells are naturally sentenced to stable and long-term loss of living capacities, even despite continuing metabolic reactions and viability. In the United Kingdom, for example, nine out of ten of all the deaths that occur daily relates to senescence, while around the world, it accounts for two-thirds of 150,000 deaths that take place daily.

Almost all animals who survive external hazards to their biological functioning eventually die from biological aging, known in life sciences as senescence. Some organisms experience negligible senescence, even exhibiting biological immortality. These include the jellyfish Turritopsis dohrnii, the hydra, and the planarian. Unnatural causes of death include suicide and predation. Of all causes, roughly 150,000 people die around the world each day. Of these, two-thirds die directly or indirectly due to senescence, but in industrialized countries – such as the United States, the United Kingdom, and Germany – the rate approaches 90% (i.e., nearly nine out of ten of all deaths are related to senescence).

Physiological death is now seen as a process, more than an event as conditions once considered indicative of death are now reversible. Where in the process, a dividing line is drawn between life and death depends on factors beyond the presence or absence of vital signs. In general, clinical death is neither necessary nor sufficient for a determination of legal death. A patient with working heart and lungs determined to be brain dead can be pronounced legally dead without clinical death occurring.

=== Life extension ===
Life extension refers to an increase in maximum or average lifespan, especially in humans, by slowing or reversing aging processes through anti-aging measures. Aging is the most common cause of death worldwide. Aging is seen as inevitable, so according to Aubrey de Grey little is spent on research into anti-aging therapies, a phenomenon known as pro-aging trance.

The average lifespan is determined by vulnerability to accidents and age or lifestyle-related afflictions such as cancer or cardiovascular disease. Extension of lifespan can be achieved by good diet, exercise, and avoidance of hazards such as smoking. Maximum lifespan is determined by the rate of aging for a species inherent in its genes. A recognized method of extending maximum lifespan is calorie restriction. Theoretically, the extension of the maximum lifespan can be achieved by reducing the rate of aging damage, by periodic replacement of damaged tissues, molecular repair, or rejuvenation of deteriorated cells and tissues.

A United States poll found religious and irreligious people, as well as men and women and people of different economic classes, have similar rates of support for life extension, while Africans and Hispanics have higher rates of support than white people. 38% said they would desire to have their aging process cured.

Researchers of life extension can be known as "biomedical gerontologists." They try to understand aging, and develop treatments to reverse aging processes, or at least slow them for the improvement of health and maintenance of youthfulness. Those who use life extension findings and apply them to themselves are called "life extensionists" or "longevists." The primary life extension strategy currently is to apply anti-aging methods to attempt to live long enough to benefit from a cure for aging.

==== Cryonics ====
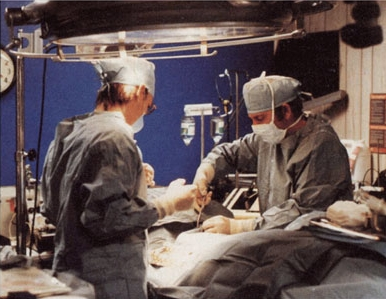
Technicians prepare a body for cryopreservation in 1985.

Cryonics (from Greek κρύος 'kryos-' meaning 'icy cold') is the low-temperature preservation of animals, including humans, who cannot be sustained by contemporary medicine, with the hope that healing and resuscitation may be possible in the future.

Cryopreservation of people and other large animals is not reversible with current technology. The stated rationale for cryonics is that people who are considered dead by current legal or medical definitions, may not necessarily be dead according to the more stringent 'information-theoretic' definition of death.

Some scientific literature is claimed to support the feasibility of cryonics. Medical science and cryobiologists generally regard cryonics with skepticism.

== Psychology ==
Death studies is a field within psychology. To varying degrees people inherently fear death, both the process and the eventuality; it is hard wired and part of the 'survival instinct' of all animals. Discussing, thinking about, or planning for their deaths causes them discomfort. This fear may cause them to put off financial planning, preparing a will and testament, or requesting help from a hospice organization.

Mortality salience is the belief that death is inevitable. However, self-esteem and culture are ways to reduce the anxiety this effect can cause. The awareness of someone's own death can cause a deepened bond in their in-group as a defense mechanism. This can also cause the person to become very judging. In a study, two groups were formed; one group was asked to reflect upon their mortality, the other was not, afterwards, the groups were told to set a bond for a prostitute. The group that did not reflect on death had an average of $50, the group who was reminded about their death had an average of $455.

Different people have different responses to the idea of their deaths. Philosopher Galen Strawson writes that the death that many people wish for is an instant, painless, unexperienced annihilation. In this unlikely scenario, the person dies without realizing it and without being able to fear it. One moment the person is walking, eating, or sleeping, and the next moment, the person is dead. Strawson reasons that this type of death would not take anything away from the person, as he believes a person cannot have a legitimate claim to ownership in the future.

== Society and culture ==
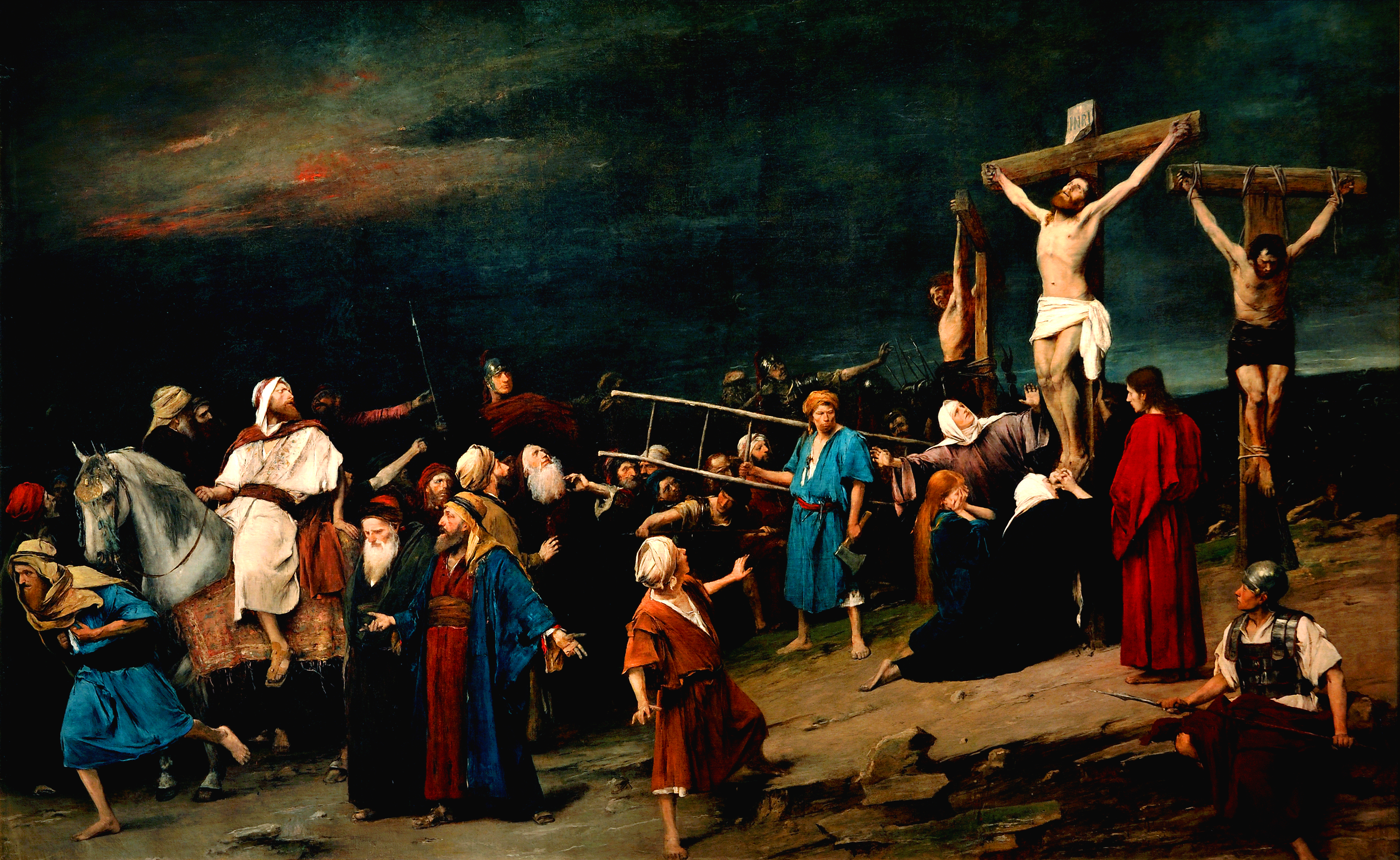
Mihály Munkácsy, Golgotha, depicting the death of Jesus

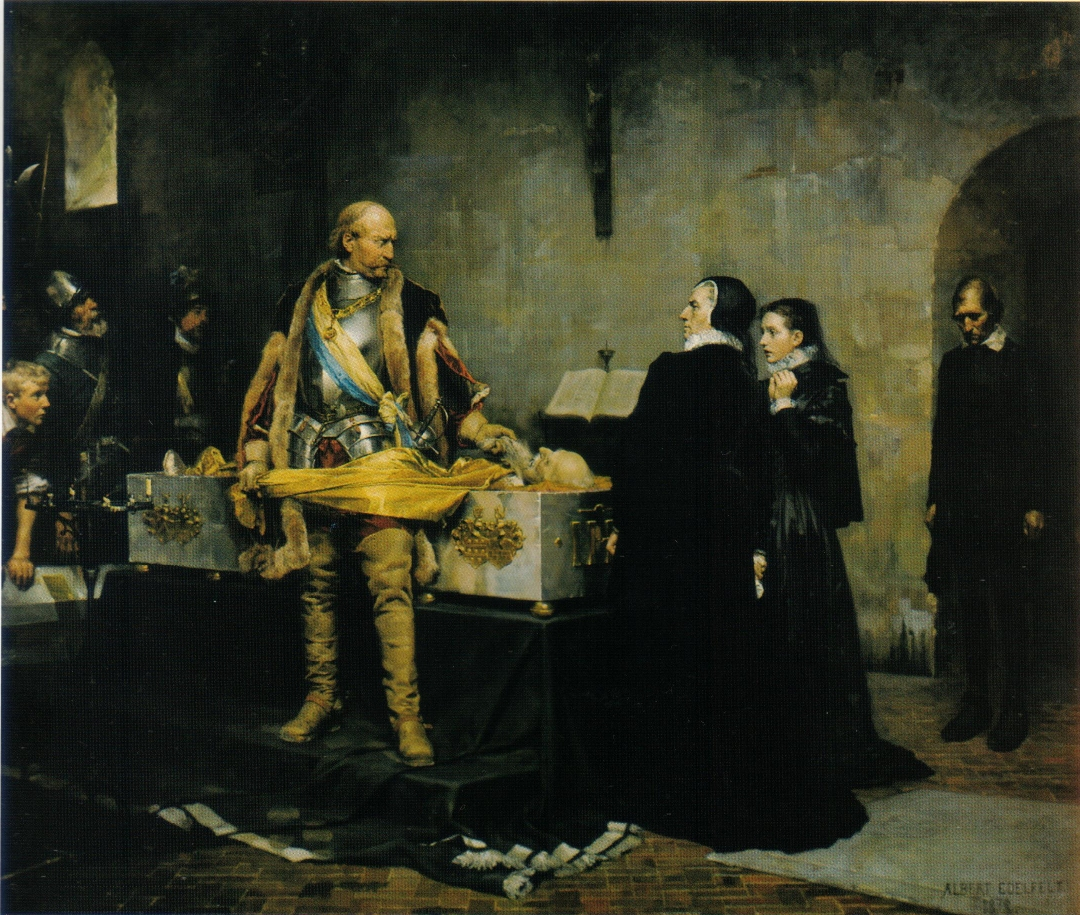
The regent Duke Charles (later King Charles IX of Sweden) insulting the corpse of Klaus Fleming. Albert Edelfelt, 1878

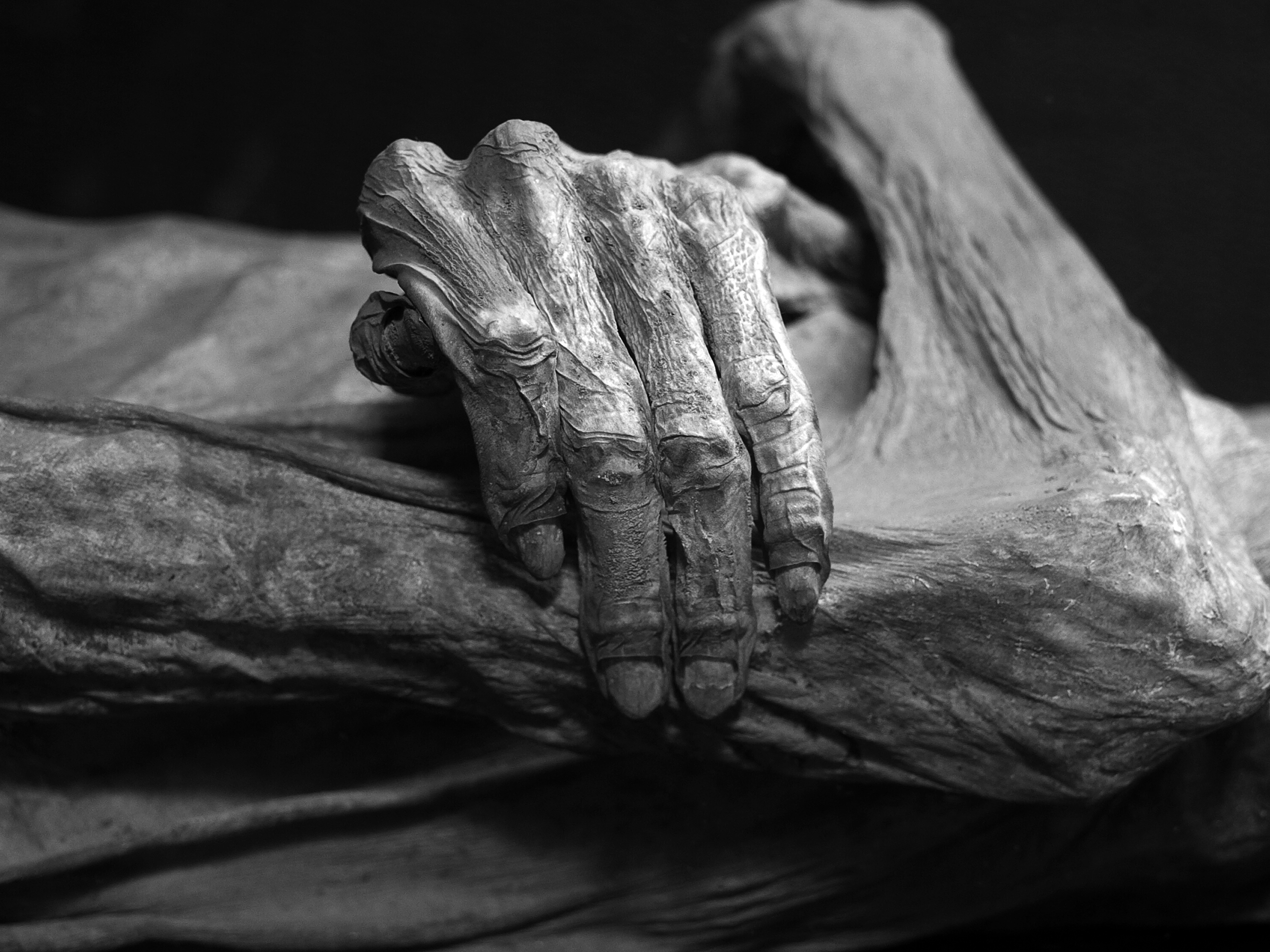
Dead bodies can be mummified either naturally, as this one from Guanajuato, or by intention, as those in ancient Egypt.

In society, the nature of death and humanity's awareness of its mortality has, for millennia, been a concern of the world's religious traditions and philosophical inquiry. This includes belief in resurrection or an afterlife (associated with Abrahamic religions), reincarnation or rebirth (associated with Dharmic religions), or that consciousness permanently ceases to exist, known as eternal oblivion (associated with secular humanism).

Commemoration ceremonies after death may include various mourning, funeral practices, and ceremonies for honoring the deceased. The physical remains of a person, commonly known as a corpse or body, are usually interred whole or cremated, though among the world's cultures, there are a variety of other methods of mortuary disposal. In the English language, blessings directed towards a dead person include rest in peace (originally the Latin, requiescat in pace) or its initialism RIP.

Death is the center of many traditions and organizations; customs relating to death are a feature of every culture around the world. Much of this revolves around the care of the dead, as well as the afterlife and the disposal of bodies upon the onset of death. The disposal of human corpses does, in general, begin with the last offices before significant time has passed, and ritualistic ceremonies often occur, most commonly interment or cremation. This is not a unified practice; in Tibet, for instance, the body is given a sky burial and left on a mountain top. Proper preparation for death and techniques and ceremonies for producing the ability to transfer one's spiritual attainments into another body (reincarnation) are subjects of detailed study in Tibet. Mummification or embalming is also prevalent in some cultures to slow the rate of decay. The rise of secularism resulted in material mementos of death declining.

Some parts of death in culture are legally based, having laws for when death occurs, such as the receiving of a death certificate, the settlement of the deceased estate, and the issues of inheritance and, in some countries, inheritance taxation.

Capital punishment is also a culturally divisive aspect of death. In most jurisdictions where capital punishment is carried out today, the death penalty is reserved for premeditated murder, espionage, treason, or as part of military justice. In some countries, sexual crimes, such as adultery and sodomy, carry the death penalty, as do religious crimes, such as apostasy. In many retentionist countries, drug trafficking is also a capital offense. In China, human trafficking and serious cases of corruption are also punished by the death penalty. In militaries around the world, courts-martial have imposed death sentences for offenses such as cowardice, desertion, insubordination, and mutiny. Mutiny is punishable by death in the United States.

Death in warfare and suicide attacks also have cultural links, and the ideas of dulce et decorum est pro patria mori, which translates to "It is sweet and proper to die for one's country", is a concept that dates to antiquity. Additionally, grieving relatives of dead soldiers and death notification are embedded in many cultures. Recently in the Western world—with the increase in terrorism following the September 11 attacks but also further back in time with suicide bombings, kamikaze missions in World War II, and suicide missions in a host of other conflicts in history—death for a cause by way of suicide attack, including martyrdom, have had significant cultural impacts.

Suicide, in general, and particularly euthanasia, are also points of cultural debate. Both acts are understood very differently in different cultures. In Japan, for example, ending a life with honor by seppuku was considered a desirable death, whereas according to traditional Christian and Islamic cultures, suicide is viewed as a sin.

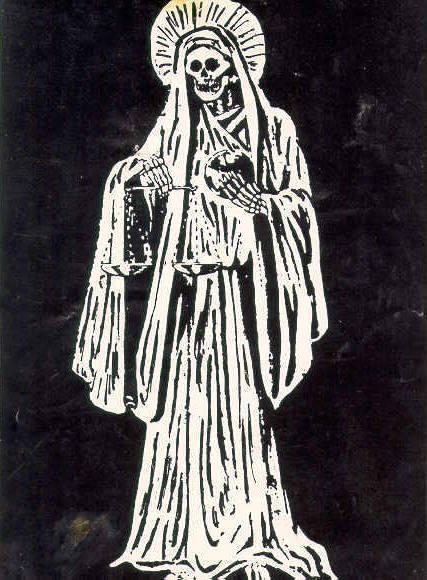
Santa Muerte, the personification of death in Mexican tradition

Death is personified in many cultures, with such symbolic representations as the Grim Reaper, Azrael, the Hindu god Yama, and Father Time. In western cultures, the Grim Reaper, or figures similar to it, is the most popular depiction of death.

In Brazil, death is counted officially when it is registered by existing family members at a cartório, a government-authorized registry. Before being able to file for an official death, the deceased must have been registered for an official birth at the cartório. Though a Public Registry Law guarantees all Brazilian citizens the right to register deaths, regardless of the financial means of their family members (often children), the Brazilian government has not taken away the burden, hidden costs, and fees of filing for a death. For many impoverished families, the indirect costs and burden of filing for a death lead to a more appealing unofficial, local, and cultural burial, which in turn raises the debate about inaccurate mortality rates.

Talking about death and witnessing it is a difficult issue in most cultures. Western societies may like to treat the dead with the utmost material respect, with an official embalmer and associated rites. Eastern societies like India may be more open to accepting it as a fait accompli, with a funeral procession of the dead body ending in an open-air burning-to-ashes.

=== Place of death ===
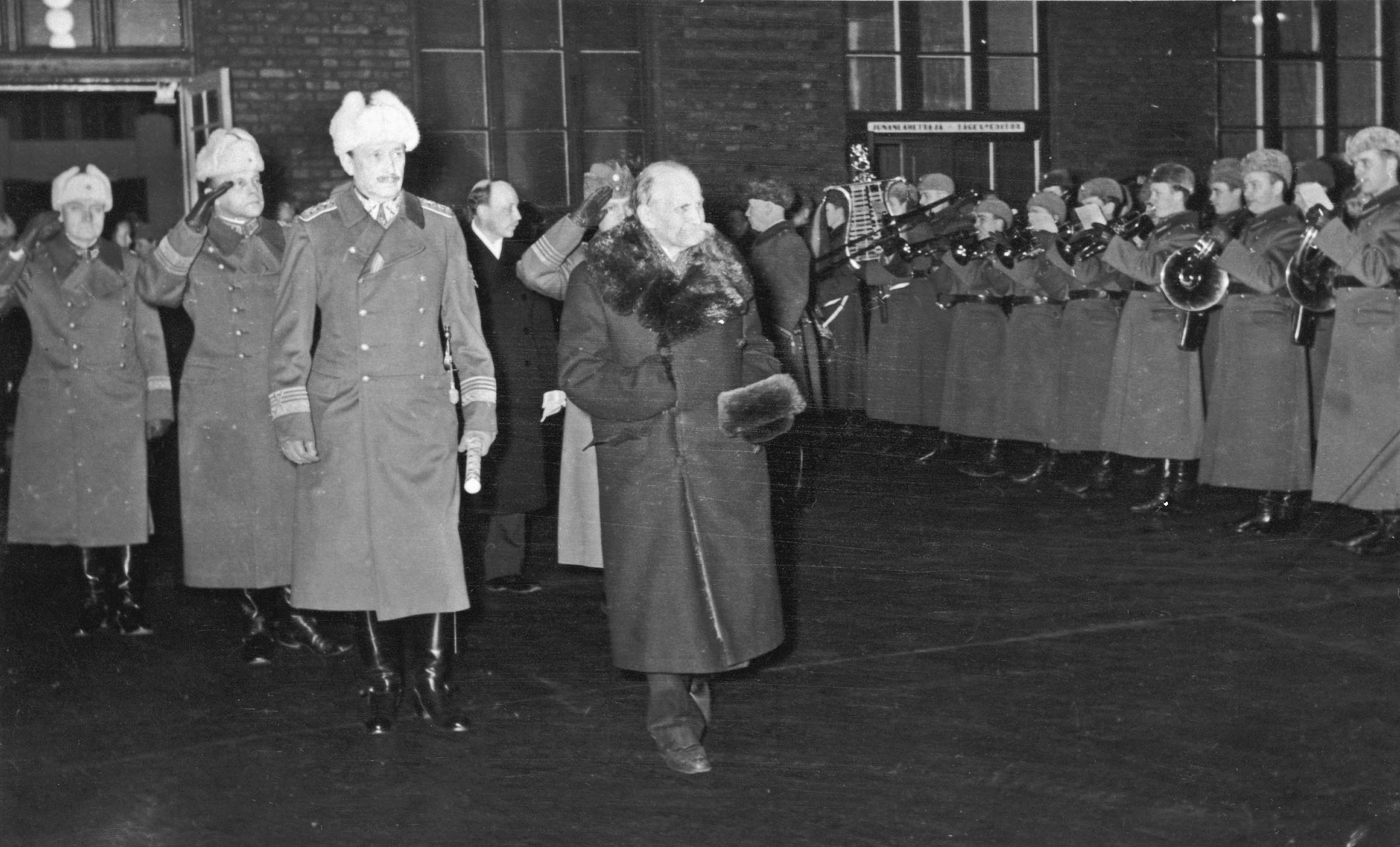
Kyösti Kallio (middle), the fourth President of the Republic of Finland, had a fatal heart attack a few seconds after this photograph was taken by Hugo Sundström on 19 December 1940, at Helsinki railway station in Helsinki, Finland.

Around 1930, most people in Western countries died in their own homes, surrounded by family, and comforted by clergy, neighbors, and doctors making house calls. By the mid-20th century, half of all Americans died in a hospital. By the start of the 21st century, only about 20 to 25% of people in developed countries died outside of a medical institution. The shift from dying at home towards dying in a professional medical environment has been termed the "Invisible Death." This shift occurred gradually over the years, and most deaths now occur outside the home.

=== Origins of death in mythology ===
The origin of death is a theme or myth of how death came to be. It is present in nearly all cultures across the world, as death is a universal happening. This makes it an origin myth, a myth that describes how a feature of the natural or social world appeared. There can be some similarities between myths and cultures. In North American mythology, the theme of a man who wants to be immortal and a man who wants to die can be seen across many Indigenous people. In Christianity, death is the result of the fall of man after eating the fruit from the tree of the knowledge of good and evil. In Greek mythology, the opening of Pandora's box releases death upon the world.

=== Religious views ===
==== Afterlife ====
Much interest and debate surround the question of what happens to one's consciousness as one's body dies. The belief in the permanent loss of consciousness after death is often called eternal oblivion. The belief that the stream of consciousness is preserved after physical death is described by the term afterlife.

Near-death experiences (NDEs) describe the subjective experiences associated with impending death. Some survivors of such experiences report it as "seeing the afterlife while they were dying". Seeing a being of light and talking with it, life flashing before the eyes, and the confirmation of cultural beliefs of the afterlife are common themes in NDEs.

Many religious traditions regard funeral and end-of-life rituals as important practices that help mark or support an individual's passage from life to afterlife.

==== Buddhism ====
In Buddhist doctrine and practice, death plays an important role. Awareness of death motivated Prince Siddhartha to strive to find the "deathless" and finally attain enlightenment. In Buddhist doctrine, death functions as a reminder of the value of having been born as a human being. Rebirth as a human being is considered the only state in which one can attain enlightenment. Therefore, death helps remind oneself that one should not take life for granted. The belief in rebirth among Buddhists does not necessarily remove death anxiety since all existence in the cycle of rebirth is considered filled with suffering, and being reborn many times does not necessarily mean that one progresses.

Death is part of several key Buddhist tenets, such as the Four Noble Truths and dependent origination.

In Buddhist traditions, preparation for death is regarded as an important aspect of spiritual practice. Practitioners are encouraged to contemplate the inevitability of death as a means of developing awareness of the value and rarity of human life. Since death is unavoidable and its timing uncertain, individuals are advised to live ethically by avoiding unwholesome actions of body, speech, and mind while cultivating wholesome actions that support spiritual progress and liberation.

The mental state at the time of death is considered especially significant because it is believed to influence the transition to a future existence. According to Buddhist teachings, the final moment of consciousness in one life conditions the first moment of consciousness in the next. For this reason, practitioners seek to cultivate calmness, mindfulness, and emotional stability throughout life so that fear, anger, or agitation do not dominate the mind at the moment of death and negatively affect future rebirth.

==== Christianity ====
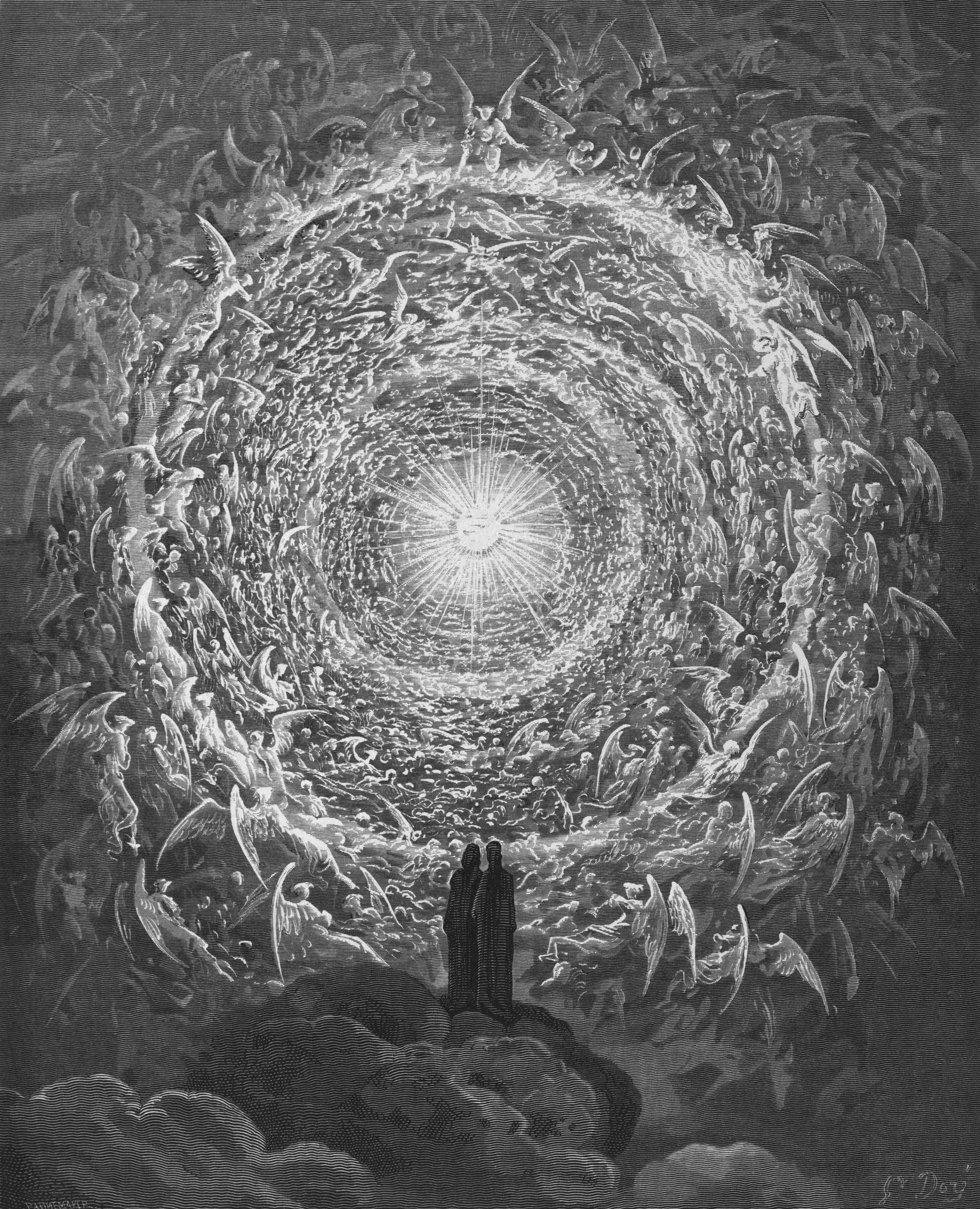
In Dante's Paradiso, Dante is with Beatrice, staring at the highest heavens.

While Christian denominations have varying beliefs, they generally agree that all humans are souls, a unity of their physical body and their spirit.

After one dies, Christians believe that during this time, their spirit would separate from their body, and enter the afterlife. Additionally, they hold that when the Second Coming of Jesus occurs, resurrection would follow, and the spirit would be reunified with the body.

==== Hinduism ====
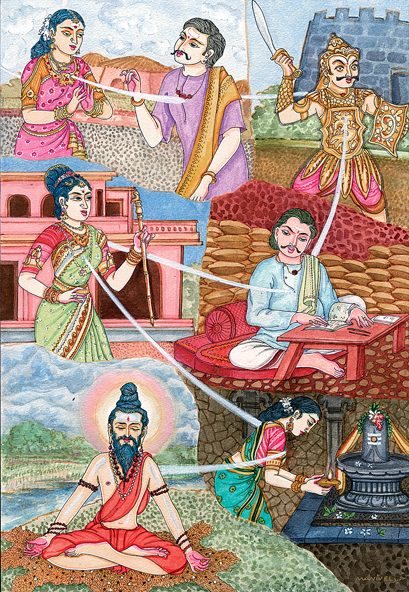
Illustration depicting Hindu beliefs about reincarnation

In Hindu texts, death is described as the individual eternal spiritual jiva-atma (soul or conscious self) exiting the current temporary material body. The soul exits this body when the body can no longer sustain the conscious self (life), which may be due to mental or physical reasons or, more accurately, the inability to act on one's kama (material desires). During conception, the soul enters a compatible new body based on the remaining merits and demerits of one's karma (good/bad material activities based on dharma) and the state of one's mind (impressions or last thoughts) at the time of death. Liberation from the cycle of births and deaths (samsara), known as moksa, is regarded as the ultimate goal of human life.

Usually, the process of reincarnation makes one forget all memories of one's previous life. Because nothing really dies and the temporary material body is always changing, both in this life and the next, death means forgetfulness of one's previous experiences.

==== Islam ====
The Islamic view is that death is the separation of the soul from the body as well as the beginning of the afterlife. The afterlife, or akhirah, is one of the six main beliefs in Islam. Muslims consider death as a continuation of life in another form. In Islam, life on earth right now is a short, temporary life and a testing period for every soul. True life begins with the Day of Judgement when all people will be divided into two groups. The righteous will be welcomed to jannah and others will be punished.

Muslims believe death to be wholly natural and predetermined by God. Only God knows the exact time of a person's death. The Quran emphasizes that death is inevitable. (Q50:16) Life on earth is the one and only chance for people to prepare themselves for the life to come and choose to either believe or not believe in God, and death is the end of that learning opportunity.

==== Judaism ====
There are a variety of beliefs about the afterlife within Judaism, but none of them contradict the preference for life over death. This is partially because death puts a cessation to the possibility of fulfilling any commandments.

=== Grief ===
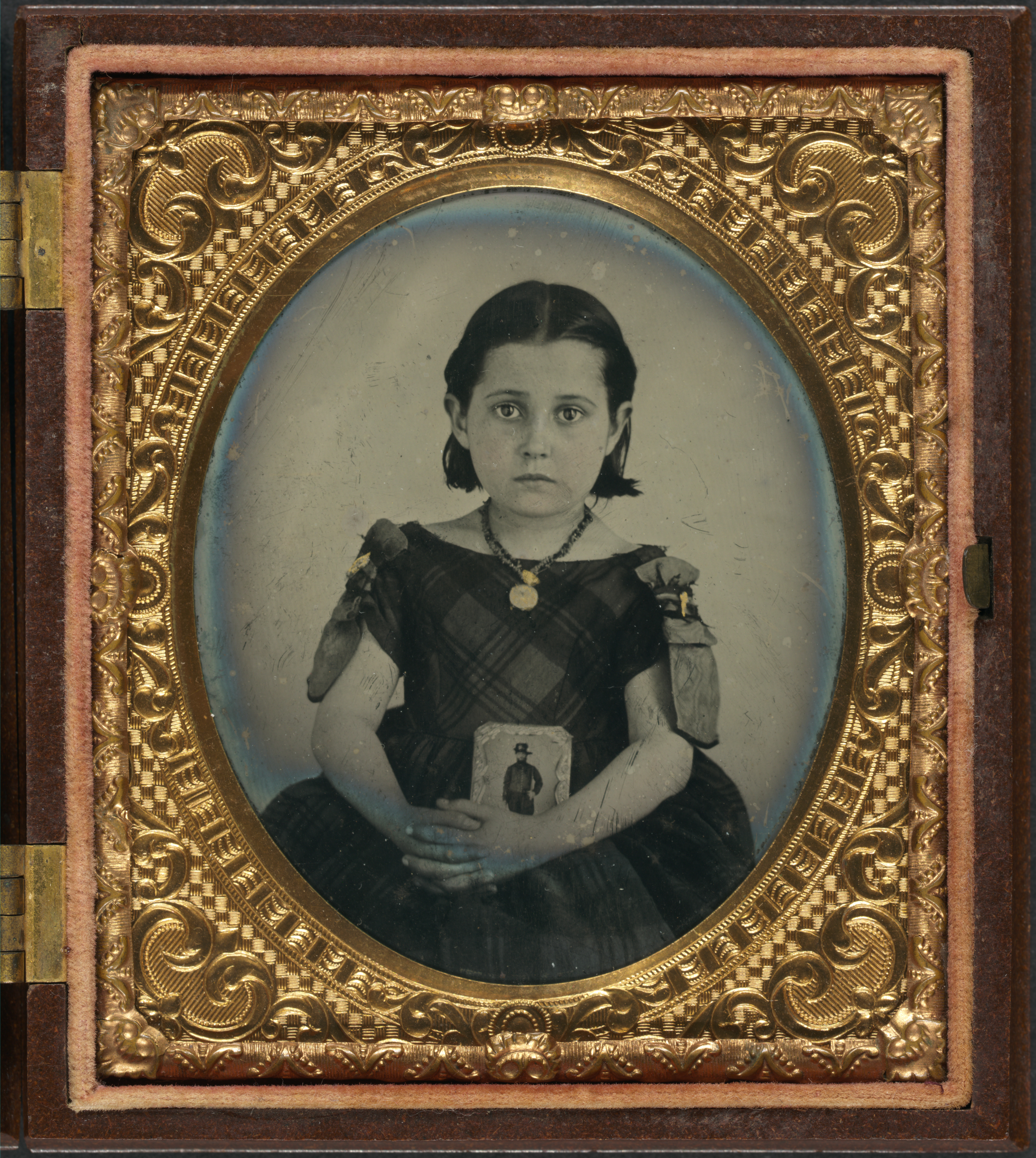
A girl mourning over the death of her father

A common human response to death is grief and mourning. While it is commonly discussed as an emotion, grief also has physical, cognitive, behavioral, social, cultural, spiritual, political and philosophical aspects. The state of being in grief is called "bereavement".

== In biology ==
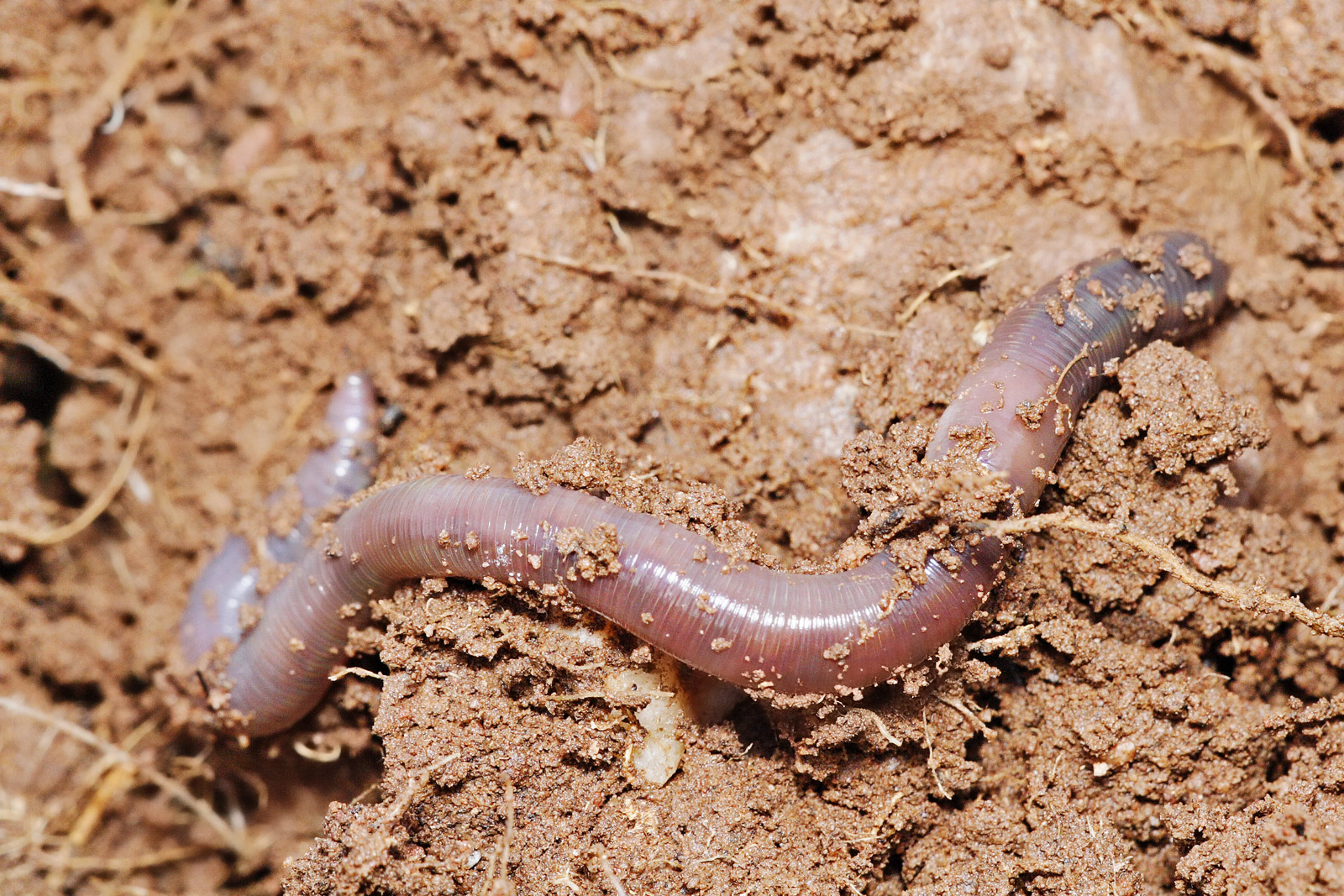
Earthworms are soil-dwelling detritivores, which can contribute to the decomposition of organic material.

Death plays a role in extinction, which is generally considered to be the death of the last individual of a species. After death, the remains of a former organism become part of the biogeochemical cycle, during which animals may be consumed by a predator or a scavenger. Organic material may then be further decomposed by detritivores, organisms that recycle detritus, returning it to the environment for reuse in the food chain, where these chemicals may eventually end up being consumed and assimilated into the cells of an organism. Examples of detritivores include earthworms, woodlice, and millipedes.

Microorganisms also play a vital role, raising the temperature of the decomposing matter as they break it down into yet simpler molecules. Not all materials need to be fully decomposed. Coal, a fossil fuel formed over vast tracts of time in swamp ecosystems, is one example.

=== Natural selection ===
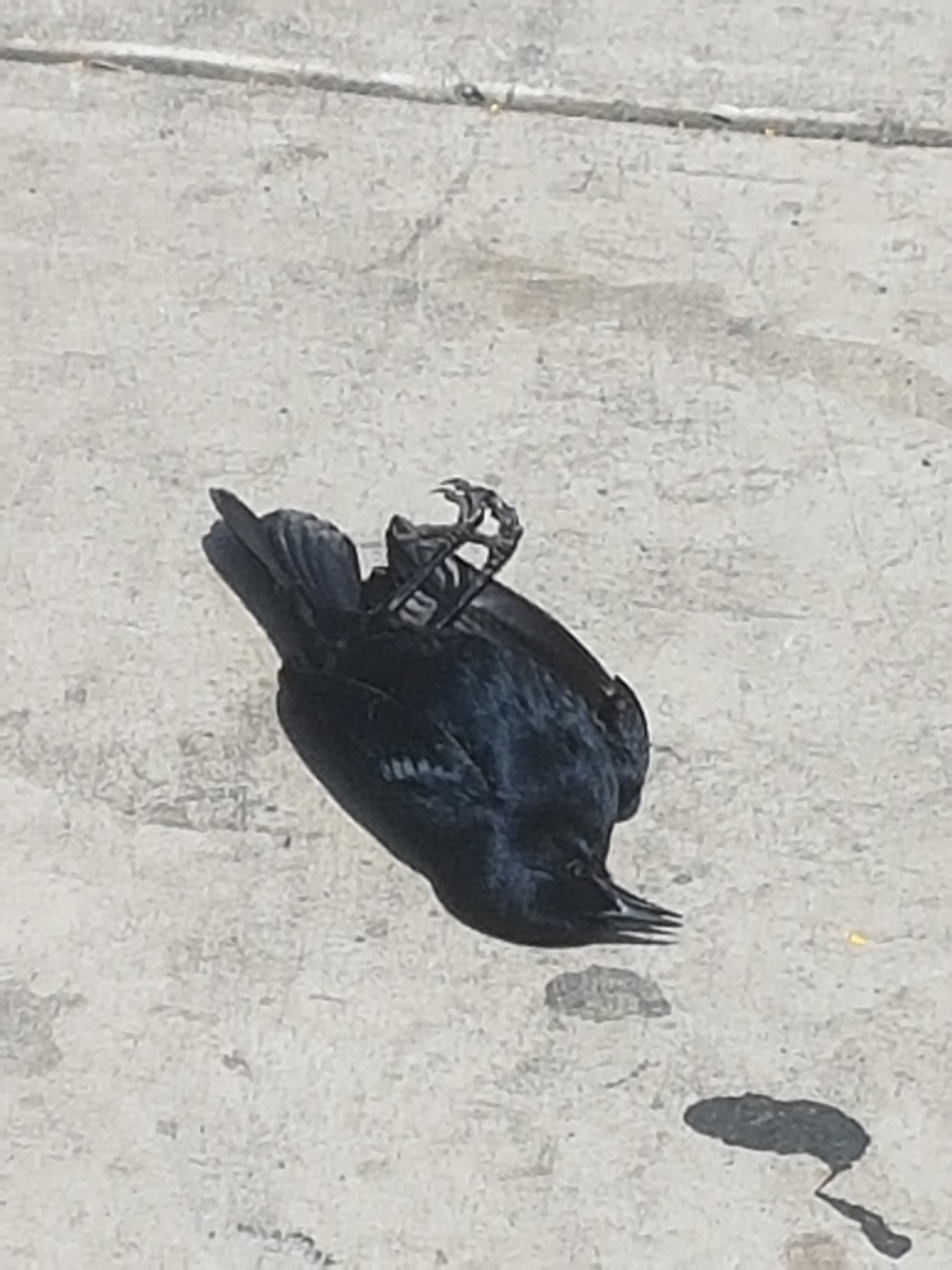
Dead Scrub blackbird in Lima, Perú

The contemporary evolutionary theory sees death as an important part of the process of natural selection. It is considered that organisms less adapted to their environment are more likely to die, having produced fewer offspring, thereby reducing their contribution to the gene pool. Their genes are thus eventually bred out of a population, leading at worst to extinction and, more positively, making the process possible, referred to as speciation. Frequency of reproduction plays an equally important role in determining species survival: an organism that dies young but leaves numerous offspring displays, according to Darwinian criteria, much greater fitness than a long-lived organism leaving only one.

Death also has a role in competition, where if a species out-competes another, there is a risk of death for the population, especially in the case where they are directly fighting over resources.

=== Evolution of aging and mortality ===
Inquiry into the evolution of aging aims to explain why so many living things and the vast majority of animals weaken and die with age. However, there are exceptions, such as Hydra and the jellyfish Turritopsis dohrnii, which research shows to be biologically immortal.

Organisms showing only asexual reproduction, such as bacteria, some protists, like the euglenoids and many amoebozoans, and unicellular organisms with sexual reproduction, colonial or not, like the volvocine algae Pandorina and Chlamydomonas, are "immortal" at some extent, dying only due to external hazards, like being eaten or meeting with a fatal accident. In multicellular organisms and also in multinucleate ciliates with a Weismannist development, that is, with a division of labor between mortal somatic (body) cells and "immortal" germ (reproductive) cells, death becomes an essential part of life, at least for the somatic line.

The Volvox algae are among the simplest organisms to exhibit that division of labor between two completely different cell types, and as a consequence, include the death of somatic line as a regular, genetically regulated part of its life history.

=== Cell death ===
Overview of signal transduction pathways involved in apoptosis

Cell death is the event of a biological cell ceasing to carry out its functions. This may be the result of the natural process of old cells dying and being replaced by new ones, as in programmed cell death, or may result from factors such as diseases, localized injury, or the death of the organism of which the cells are part. Apoptosis or type I cell-death, and autophagy or type II cell-death are both forms of programmed cell death, while necrosis is a non-physiological process that occurs as a result of infection or injury.

The term "cell necrobiology" has been used to describe the life processes associated with morphological, biochemical, and molecular changes which predispose, precede, and accompany cell death, as well as the consequences and tissue response to cell death. The word is derived from the Greek νεκρό meaning "death", βìο meaning "life", and λόγος meaning "the study of". The term was initially coined to broadly define investigations of the changes that accompany cell death, detected and measured by multiparameter flow- and laser scanning- cytometry. It has been used to describe the real-time changes during cell death, detected by flow cytometry.

== Language ==
The word "death" comes from Old English dēaþ, which in turn comes from Proto-Germanic *dauþuz (reconstructed by etymological analysis). This comes from the Proto-Indo-European stem *dheu- meaning the "process, act, condition of dying."

The concept and symptoms of death, and varying degrees of delicacy used in discussion in public forums, have generated numerous scientific, legal, and socially acceptable terms or euphemisms. When a person has died, it is also said they have "passed away", "passed on", "expired", or "gone", among other socially accepted, religiously specific, slang, and irreverent terms.

As a formal reference to a dead person, it has become common practice to use the participle form of "decease", as in "the deceased"; another noun form is "decedent".

Bereft of life, the dead person is a "corpse", "cadaver", "body", "set of remains", or when all flesh is gone, a "skeleton". The terms "carrion" and "carcass" are also used, usually for dead non-human animals. The ashes left after a cremation are lately called "cremains".

== See also ==
- Deathbed
- Death drive
- Death row
- Death trajectory
- Dying declaration
- End-of-life care
- Eschatology
- Faked death
- Human extinction
- Karoshi
- Last rites
- Spiritual death
- Stages of human death
- Taboo on the dead
- Thanatology

== Bibliography ==
- Bondeson J (2001). Buried Alive: the Terrifying History of our Most Primal Fear. W.W. Norton & Company. ISBN 978-0-393-04906-0.
- Mullin GH (2008) [1998]. Living in the Face of Death: The Tibetan Tradition. Ithaca, New York: Snow Lion Publications. ISBN 978-1-55939-310-2.
