= Galen Strawson =

British philosopher (born 1952)

- Born: Galen John Strawson; 1952 (age 73–74); England
- Father: P. F. Strawson

Education
- Education: University of Oxford; University of Cambridge; ENS (audit student); Paris I (audit student)
- Academic advisor: David Pears

Philosophical work
- Era: 20th-century philosophy
- Region: Western philosophy
- School: Analytic philosophy Direct realism
- Institutions: University of Reading, City University of New York, Oxford University, University of Texas, Austin
- Doctoral students: J. A. Harris
- Main interests: Philosophy of mind, metaphysics, philosophy of action
- Notable ideas: Panpsychism; Realistic physicalism

Galen John Strawson (/ˈstrɔːsən/; born 1952) is a British analytic philosopher and literary critic who works primarily on philosophy of mind, metaphysics (including free will, panpsychism, the mind–body problem, and the self), John Locke, David Hume, Immanuel Kant and Friedrich Nietzsche. He was for many years a consultant editor at The Times Literary Supplement, and a regular book reviewer for The Observer, The Sunday Times, The Independent, the Financial Times and The Guardian. He is the son of philosopher P. F. Strawson. He holds a chair in the Department of Philosophy at the University of Texas, Austin, and taught for many years before that at the University of Reading, City University of New York, and Oxford University.

== Education and career ==
Strawson, the elder son of Oxford philosopher P. F. Strawson, was educated at the Dragon School, Oxford (1959–65), where he won a scholarship to Winchester College (1965–68). He left school at 16, after completing his A-levels and winning a place at Trinity Hall, Cambridge. At Cambridge, he read Oriental Studies (1969–71), Social and Political Science (1971–72), and Moral Sciences (1972–73) before moving to the University of Oxford, where he received his BPhil in philosophy in 1977 and his DPhil in philosophy in 1983. He also spent a year as an auditeur libre (audit student) at the École Normale Supérieure in Paris and at the Université Paris 1 Panthéon-Sorbonne as a French Government Scholar (1977–78).

Strawson taught at the University of Oxford from 1979 to 2000, first as a Stipendiary Lecturer at several different colleges, and then, from 1987 on, as Fellow and Tutor of Jesus College, Oxford. In 1993, he was a visiting research fellow at the Research School of Social Sciences, Canberra. He has also taught as a visiting professor at NYU (1997), Rutgers University (2000), the Massachusetts Institute of Technology (2010) and the Ecole des hautes études en sciences sociales, Paris (2012). In 2011 he was an Old Dominion Fellow, Council of the Humanities, Princeton University (2011). In 2000, he moved to the University of Reading as professor of philosophy, and was also distinguished professor of philosophy from 2004 to 2007 at the City University of New York Graduate Center. In 2012, he joined the faculty at the University of Texas, Austin, as holder of a new chair in philosophy.

== Philosophical work ==
=== Free will ===
In the free will debate, Strawson holds that there is a fundamental sense in which free will is impossible, whether determinism is true or not. He argues for this position with what he calls the "Basic Argument", noting that variations of it appear throughout the literature on free will. The argument aims to demonstrate that no one is ever ultimately morally responsible for their actions, and hence that no one has free will in the sense that usually concerns us. In its simplest form, the Basic Argument runs as follows:

1. You do what you do, in any given situation, because of the way you are.
2. To be ultimately responsible for what you do, you have to be ultimately responsible for the way you are—at least in certain crucial mental respects.
3. But you cannot be ultimately responsible for the way you are in any respect at all.
4. So you cannot be ultimately responsible for what you do.

This argument resembles Arthur Schopenhauer's position in On the Fourfold Root of the Principle of Sufficient Reason, summarised by E. F. J. Payne as the "law of motivation, which states that a definite course of action inevitably ensues on a given character and motive".

=== Panpsychism ===
Strawson has argued that what he calls "realistic physicalism" (or "realistic monism") entails panpsychism. He writes that "as a real physicalist, then, I hold that the mental/experiential is physical." He quotes the physicist Arthur Eddington in support of his position as follows: "If we must embed our schedule of indicator readings in some kind of background, at least let us accept the only hint we have received as to the significance of the background—namely that it has a nature capable of manifesting itself as a mental activity. The editor of the Journal of Consciousness Studies, Anthony Freeman, has written that panpsychism is regarded by many as either "plain crazy, or else a direct route back to animism and superstition". But it has a long tradition in Western thought.

=== History of philosophy ===
In his work in the history of philosophy, Strawson has argued for three main claims, all of which have been considered controversial. In his 1989 book The Secret Connexion, he argues that David Hume was not a "Humean" about causation. Hume did not, in other words, believe that everything we rightly think of as causation is really only a matter of regular succession or constant conjunction. (On this view, A causes B without there being any sense at all in which A brings about or gives rise to B.)

In his 2011 book The Evident Connexion, Strawson further argues that Hume is not a "Humean" about personal identity. Hume does not think that the "mind" or "self" is really nothing more than a "bundle of perceptions" or experiences. According to Strawson, while Hume does indeed believe that the "bundle of perceptions" conception of the mind is the only empirically legitimate conception of it, he rejects the idea that it can be a philosophically adequate account of the self, having renounced it in the Appendix to his Treatise Of Human Nature.

Finally, in Locke on Personal Identity: Consciousness and Concernment (2011), Strawson argues that Locke's views on personal identity—his account of what makes a person the same person over time—have, for over 300 years, and with very few exceptions, been misunderstood. He argues that two famous objections to Locke's account that have almost universally been supposed to be valid (one made by Bishop Berkeley in 1732 and repeated by Thomas Reid in 1785, the other made by Bishop Butler in 1736), are not only not objections to Locke's account but are in effect vivid illustrations of Locke's central point. All Locke is really concerned with in his account of personal identity is the question of which of a person's past acts they are morally or legally responsible for, at any given time, and in particular on the Day of Judgment. Locke is also particularly concerned to argue, directly against the spirit of his time, that one can be a materialist and still be an orthodox Christian.

== Publications ==
=== Books ===
- Freedom and Belief (1986), ISBN 0-19-823933-5. Revised edition (2010), ISBN 978-0199247493 (hardcover), ISBN 978-0199247509 (paperback)
- The Secret Connexion: Causation, Realism, and David Hume (1989), ISBN 0-19-824038-4. Review by Colin McGinn. Revised edition (2014), ISBN 978-0-19-960584-2
- Mental Reality (1994), ISBN 0-262-19352-3. Revised edition (2009), ISBN 978-0262513104
- The Self? (editor) (2005), ISBN 1-4051-2987-5
- Consciousness and Its Place in Nature: Does Physicalism Entail Panpsychism? (2006), ISBN 1-84540-059-3
- Real Materialism and Other Essays (2008), ISBN 978-0-19-926743-9
- Selves: An Essay in Revisionary Metaphysics (2009), ISBN 978-0-19-825006-7. Corrected paperback edition (2011), ISBN 9780199693108
- The Evident Connexion: Hume on Personal Identity (2011), ISBN 978-0-19-960850-8
- Locke on Personal Identity: Consciousness and Concernment (2011), ISBN 978-0-691-14757-4
- The Subject of Experience (2017), ISBN 978-0198777885
- Things That Bother Me: Death, Freedom, the Self, etc. (2018) (New York Review Books), ISBN 978-1-68137-220-4
  - German translation Was mich umtreibt: Tod, Freiheit, Ich (2019) ISBN 978-3772530166
  - Korean translation 불면의 이유 (2020), ISBN 9788993690729
- Consciousness and Its Place in Nature: Why Physicalism Entails Panpsychism, 2nd edition, revised and expanded, ed. A. Freeman and G. Horswell, (Exeter: Imprint Academic) (2024), ISBN 978-1788361187
- Stuff, Quality, Structure: The Whole Go (2024) (Oxford University Press), ISBN 978-0-19-890365-9

=== Selected articles ===
- "Flames of Hell". Review of Gilles & Jeanne, by Michel Tournier. The Observer, London, March 1, 1987, p. 28.
- "Idris the Ingénu" Review of The Golden Droplet, by Michel Tournier. London Review of Books, Vol. 10, No. 2, 21 January 1988.
- "Red and 'Red'" (1989), Synthèse 78, pp. 193–232.
- "The Impossibility of Moral Responsibility" (1994), Philosophical Studies 75, pp. 5–24.
- "'The Self" (1997), Journal of Consciousness Studies 4, pp. 405–28.
- "The bounds of freedom" (2001), in The Oxford Handbook on Free Will, ed. R. Kane (Oxford University Press), pp. 441–60.
- "Hume on himself" (2001), in Essays in Practical Philosophy: From Action to values, ed. D. Egonsson, J. Josefsson, B. Petersson and T. Rønnow-Rasmussen (Aldershot: Ashgate Press), pp. 69–94.
- "Real Materialism" (2003), in Chomsky and his Critics, ed. L. Antony and N. Hornstein (Oxford: Blackwell), pp. 49–88. Reprinted in Real Materialism and Other Essays (2008).
- "Mental ballistics: the involuntariness of spontaneity" (2003), Proceedings of the Aristotelian Society, pp. 227–56.
- "A Fallacy of our Age" ('Against Narrative') in the Times Literary Supplement, 15 October 2004
- "Against Narrativity" (2004), Ratio 17, pp. 428–52.
- "Gegen die Narrativität" (2005), revised and expanded version of "Against Narrativity" in Deutsche Zeitschrift für Philosophie 53, pp. 3–22.
- "Episodic ethics" (2005) in Narrative and Understanding Person, ed. D. Hutto (Cambridge: Cambridge University Press), pp. 85–115.
- "Why I have no future" (2009) The Philosophers' Magazine, Issue 38
- "Against 'corporism': the two uses of I" (2009) Organon F 16, pp. 428–448.
- "The Self" in The Oxford Handbook of Philosophy of Mind, ed. B. McLaughlin and A. Beckermann (Oxford University Press), pp. 541–64.
- "5 Questions on Mind and Consciousness" (2009), in Mind and Consciousness: 5 Questions (AutomaticPress/VIP,) pp. 191–204.
- "5 Questions on Action" (2009), in Philosophy of Action: 5 Questions (AutomaticPress/VIP), pp. 253–9.
- "On the SESMET theory of subjectivity" (2009), in Mind That Abides, ed. D. Skrbina (Amsterdam: John Benjamins), pp. 57–64.
- "The identity of the categorical and the dispositional" (2008), Analysis 68/4, pp. 271–8.
- "Radical Self-Awareness" (2010), in Self, No Self?: Perspectives from Analytical, Phenomenological, and Indian Traditions, ed. M. Siderits, E. Thompson, and D. Zahavi (Oxford University Press), pp. 274–307.
- "The depth(s) of the twentieth century" (2010), Analysis 70/4:1.
- "Fundamental Singleness: subjects as objects (how to turn the first two Paralogisms into valid arguments)" (2010), in The Metaphysics of Consciousness, ed. P. Basile et al.(Cambridge University Press), pp. 61–92.
- "Narrativity and non-Narrativity" (2010), in Wiley Interdisciplinary Reviews: Cognitive Science 1, pp. 775–80.
- "La impossibilidad de la responsabilidad moral en sentido último" (2010), Spanish Translation of "The Impossibility of (Ultimate) Moral Responsibility", in Cuadernos Eticos
- "Cognitive phenomenology: real life" (2011), in Cognitive Phenomenology, ed.T. Bayne and M. Montague (Oxford University Press), pp. 285–325.
- "The impossibility of ultimate responsibility?" in Free Will and Modern Science, ed. R. Swinburne (London: British Academy) (December), pp. 126–40.
- "Owning the Past: Reply to Stokes" (2011), Journal of Consciousness Studies 18, pp. 170–95.
- "The minimal self" (2011), in Oxford Handbook of the Self, ed. S. Gallagher (Oxford University Press), pp. 253–278.
- "Real naturalism" (2012), in Proceedings of the American Philosophical Association 86/2, pp. 125–154.
- "I and I: immunity to error through misidentification of the subject" (2012), in Immunity to Error Through Misidentification: New Essays, ed. S. Prosser and F. Recanati (Cambridge University Press)
- "All My Hopes Vanish: Hume’s Appendix" (2012), in The Continuum Companion to Hume, ed. A Bailey and D. O’Brien (London: Continuum)
- "We live beyond any tale that we happen to enact" (2012), in Harvard Review of Philosophy 18, pp. 73–90.
- "Contra la Narratividad" (2013), Spanish Translation of "Against Narrativity", in Cuadernos de Crîtica 56 (México: Instituto de Investigaciones Filosóficas)
- Italian Translation of "The Minimal Subject" (2014) in Quel che Resta dell’Io (Roma: Castelvecchi) pp. 41
- "Free will" (2015), in Norton Introduction to Philosophy, ed. A. Byrne, J. Cohen, G. Rosen and S. Shiffrin (New York:Norton)
- "Real direct realism" (2015), in The Nature of Phenomenal Qualities, ed. P. Coates and S. Coleman (Oxford University Press)
- "Nietzsche’s metaphysics?" (2015), in Nietzsche on Mind and Nature, ed.M. Dries and P. Kail (Oxford University Press)
- "When I enter most intimately into what I call myself" (2015), in Oxford Handbook of David Hume ed. Paul Russell (Oxford University Press)
- "The unstoried life" (2015), in On Life-Writing, ed. Z. Leader (Oxford: Oxford University Press)
- "'The secrets of all hearts': Locke on personal identity" (2015), in Mind, Self, and Person, ed. A. O'Hear (Cambridge: Cambridge University Press)
- "Mind and being: the primacy of panpsychism", in Panpsychism: Philosophical Essays, ed. G. Bruntrup and L. Jaskolla (New York: Oxford University Press)
- "The concept of consciousness in the twentieth century" (2016), in Consciousness, ed. A. Simmons (New York: Oxford University Press)
- "Narrative bypassing", in A New Approach to Studies of the Self, ed. N. Praetorius, Journal of Consciousness Studies 16, pp. 125–139
- "Conceivability and the silence of physics" (2017), Journal of Consciousness Studies
- "Descartes's mind" (2017), in Descartes and Cartesianism: Essays in Honour of Desmond Clarke, ed. S. Gaukroger and C. Wilson (Oxford: Oxford University Press)
- "Consciousness never left" (2017), in The Return of Consciousness, ed. K. Almqvist and A. Haag (Stockholm: Axel and Margaret Axson Johnson Foundation)
- "Physicalist panpsychism" (2017), in The Blackwell Companion to Consciousness, 2nd ed, ed. S. Schneider and M. Velmans (New York: Wiley-Blackwell)
- "Contre la narrativité" (2017), French Translation of "Against Narrativity", in Fabula-LHT
- "What does 'physical' mean? A prolegomenon to physicalist panpsychism", in Routledge Handbook of Panpsychism
- "Descartes and the Buddha—a rapprochement?" in Reasons and Empty Persons: Mind, Metaphysics, and Morality: Essays in Honor of Mark Siderits, ed. C. Coseru (Springer, 2023) pp. 63-86
- "Blockers and laughter: panpsychism, archepsychism, pantachepsychism" (2024), in second revised and expanded edition of Consciousness and its Place in Nature, ed. A Freeman (Exeter: Imprint Academic)
- "The Impossibility of Subjectless Experience" (2024), in Journal of Consciousness Studies vol. 31, pp. 26–36

== See also ==
- Epiphenomenalism
- Free will
- Immanuel Kant
- Neuroscience of free will
- Philosophical zombie
