= Jyoty =

Indian-Dutch musical artist

Jyoty Singh
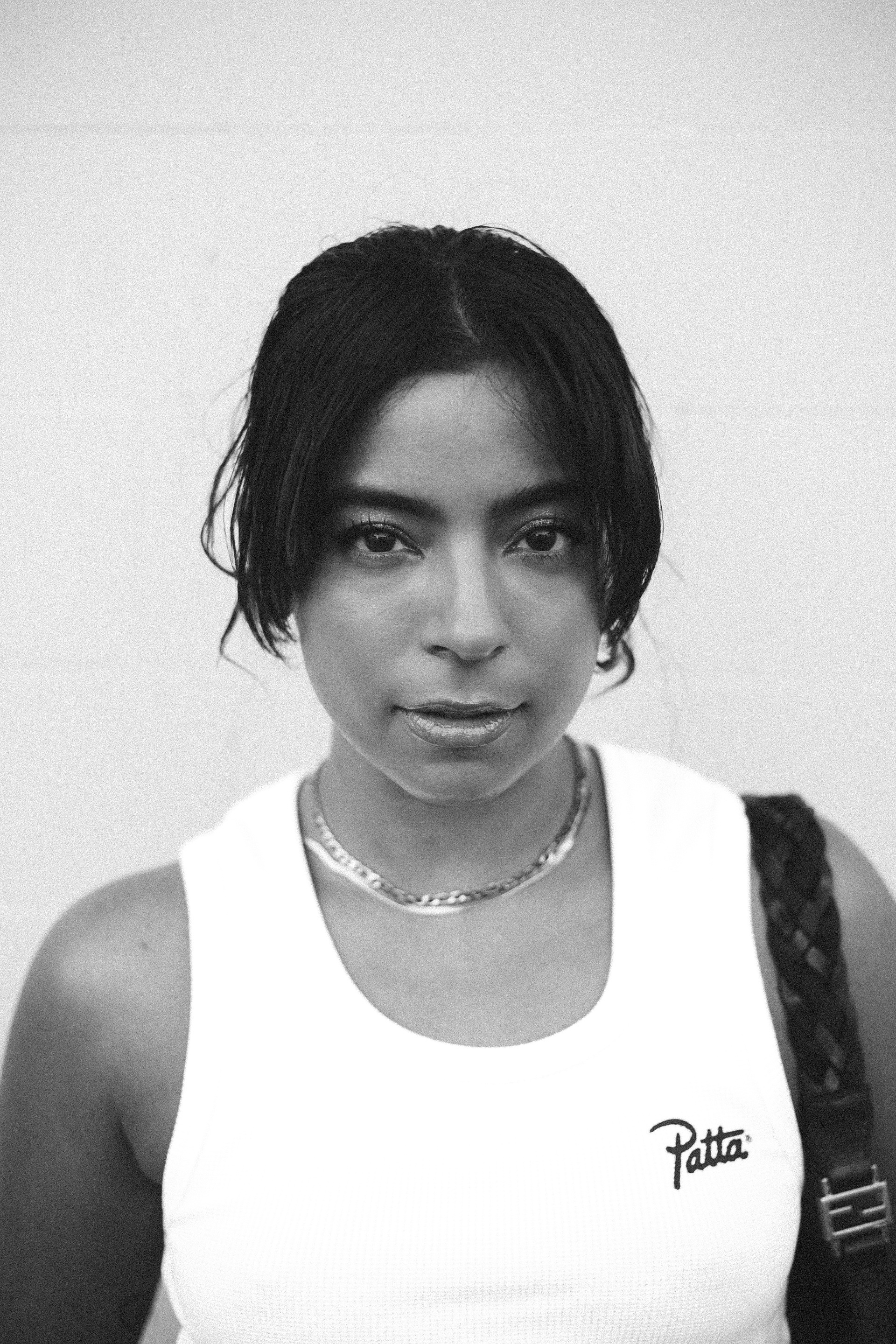
- Jyoty by Luq Dias

Background information
- Also known as: Jyoty
- Born: August 27, 1990 (age 36); Amsterdam, Netherlands
- Genres: Hip hop; R&B; Baile funk; Amapiano; Afrobeats; Dancehall; Jungle; Grime; Garage
- Occupations: DJ; Radio host; Creative producer
- Years active: 2017–present

Jyoty Singh (born 27 August 1990), known professionally as Jyoty, is an Indian-Dutch DJ, radio host, and creative producer based in London, United Kingdom. Renowned for her eclectic, multi-genre DJ sets, she blends styles such as baile funk, amapiano, afrobeats, dancehall, jungle, grime, garage, neo soul, R&B, and hip hop. Jyoty has gained international recognition for her performances at major venues and festivals, her long-running radio show on Rinse FM, and her advocacy for diversity in the music industry. She has been featured on the covers of prominent music publications, including Mixmag, DJ Mag, Notion Magazine, and Gauchoworld, and led the Homegrown crew at Red Bull's Culture Clash 2025 at Drumsheds. In 2025, she headlined Alexandra Palace in London with her one-night event "Jyoty’s Palace".

== Early life ==
Jyoty Singh was born on 27 August 1990 in Amsterdam, Netherlands, to Punjabi Indian parents. Raised on the west side of Amsterdam, she developed a passion for music through watching Aaliyah's "Rock The Boat" on MTV and attending concerts by Erykah Badu and Jill Scott at age 14. As a teenager, she immersed herself in Amsterdam's nightlife, frequenting events like the rap-focused Bassline, bass-heavy Oi, and indie sleaze party Girls Love DJs, where she discovered dancehall, garage, and UK funky. She worked at her father's restaurant from age 11 and later at a sneaker store, engaging with streetwear and hip hop culture. Singh studied Political Science and Philosophy at university in Amsterdam and moved to London at 22 to pursue a master's degree in World History and Cultures at King's College London.

== Career ==
=== Early career and Rinse FM ===
After relocating to London in 2012, Singh worked as a doorperson at influential venues, including Boiler Room, and managed guestlists for events like Night Slugs, Jaded, and Ego, immersing herself in London's club culture. She held jobs at Portcullis House for the Labour Party, in tech and marketing start-ups, and as a creative producer at Mixcloud under their "Loud" production company, creating campaigns for brands like Adidas.

In 2017, Singh began co-hosting a show on Rinse FM at a friend's invitation, which evolved into a weekly residency that has spanned nearly a decade. Her radio show is known for its genre-spanning playlists, featuring baile funk, amapiano, afrobeats, and UK garage, and early interviews with artists like Cardi B, Greentea Peng, Princess Nokia, and Masego. Her ability to discover new talent and connect with listeners has built a global following, with her Rinse FM shows archived on SoundCloud.

=== DJ career and global recognition ===
Singh began DJing in 2017 after Jamz Supernova encouraged her to perform at Bussey Building, despite initially lacking beatmatching skills. Her 2019 Boiler Room performance went viral, amassing over 5 million plays across YouTube and TikTok, significantly elevating her profile. Known for unpredictable sets that blend global club sounds, she has performed at iconic venues like Brixton Academy (London), Knockdown Center (New York), KOKO (London), and Paradiso (Amsterdam), often selling out shows within hours. Her 2022 European tour included 20 sold-out dates, with headline shows at KOKO and Paradiso.

Jyoty has appeared at major festivals, including Melt Festival, Parklife Festival, Glastonbury Festival, All Points East, and Boiler Room's 2023 outdoor festival. In 2025, she led the Homegrown crew at Red Bull's Culture Clash at Drumsheds in London, alongside Flowdan, Lil Silva, Conducta, and Stush, representing electronic club culture in a four-round battle inspired by Jamaican sound clash traditions. Although the Spice Army, led by Spice, won the event, Jyoty's crew was praised for its unique live dubs and UK-focused electronic sounds. In 2025, Jyoty announced her biggest headline show to date, "Jyoty’s Palace", at London's Alexandra Palace, becoming one of the few DJs to headline the venue.

=== Homegrown and community initiatives ===
In 2022, Singh launched Homegrown, a series of intimate club nights with a no-phones policy and unannounced line-ups to foster authentic, inclusive club culture. These events, emphasizing community and freedom of expression, have sold out rapidly in Amsterdam, New York, London and Barcelona, at venues including KOKO, Paradiso, Public Records and Razzmatazz. She also founded the podcast series For Real, For Real and has hosted DJ workshops, including sessions for women in Kolkata, India, with the British Council, and a six-week course for young British Asian women aspiring to enter the music industry. In 2023, she was among over 50 artists, including Massive Attack and Brian Eno, who signed an open letter urging Field Day to distance itself from its parent company KKR, due to ethical concerns over its investments in Israeli companies linked to the Gaza genocide.

=== Media and endorsements ===
Jyoty has been featured on the covers of Mixmag (January 2023), DJ Mag, Notion, and Gauchoworld, cementing her influence in global music culture. Her 2023 Mixmag cover mix, featuring UK garage, baile funk, and pop edits, was highlighted as one of the year's best DJ mixes. She has served as a music supervisor for brands like Patta, Jacquemus, and Prada, and advises producers on emerging talent. With over 245,000 TikTok followers, her social media presence amplifies her cultural impact.

== Personal life ==
Singh identifies strongly with her Indian heritage and advocates for greater diversity in the music industry, particularly for South Asian women. She has spoken about overcoming cultural expectations and the lack of representation in the industry, aiming to create opportunities through her workshops and mentorship. She resides in London and maintains close ties to her Amsterdam roots.

== Discography ==
As of 2025, Jyoty has not released original music but is known for her curated DJ mixes and radio shows, available on platforms like SoundCloud and Rinse FM.
