= Casualty =

Casualty may refer to:

- Casualty (person), a person who is killed or rendered unfit for service in a war or natural disaster
  - Civilian casualty, a non-combatant killed or injured in warfare
- The emergency department of a hospital, also known as a Casualty Department or Casualty Ward (chiefly in the UK and in some English-speaking Commonwealth nations)
- Casualty (TV series), a long-running British emergency medical drama series
- Casualty 1900s, a British medical drama, then series, including Casualty 1906, Casualty 1907, and Casualty 1909
- Casualty (album), a 2019 album by Anna Akana
- Casualty insurance, a type of insurance
- "Casualty", a 2011 song by Nicole Scherzinger from the album Killer Love
- "Casualty", a 2024 song by Linkin Park from the album From Zero

== See also ==
- Casual (disambiguation)
- Causality (disambiguation)
