= Printworks (London) =

Event venue in England

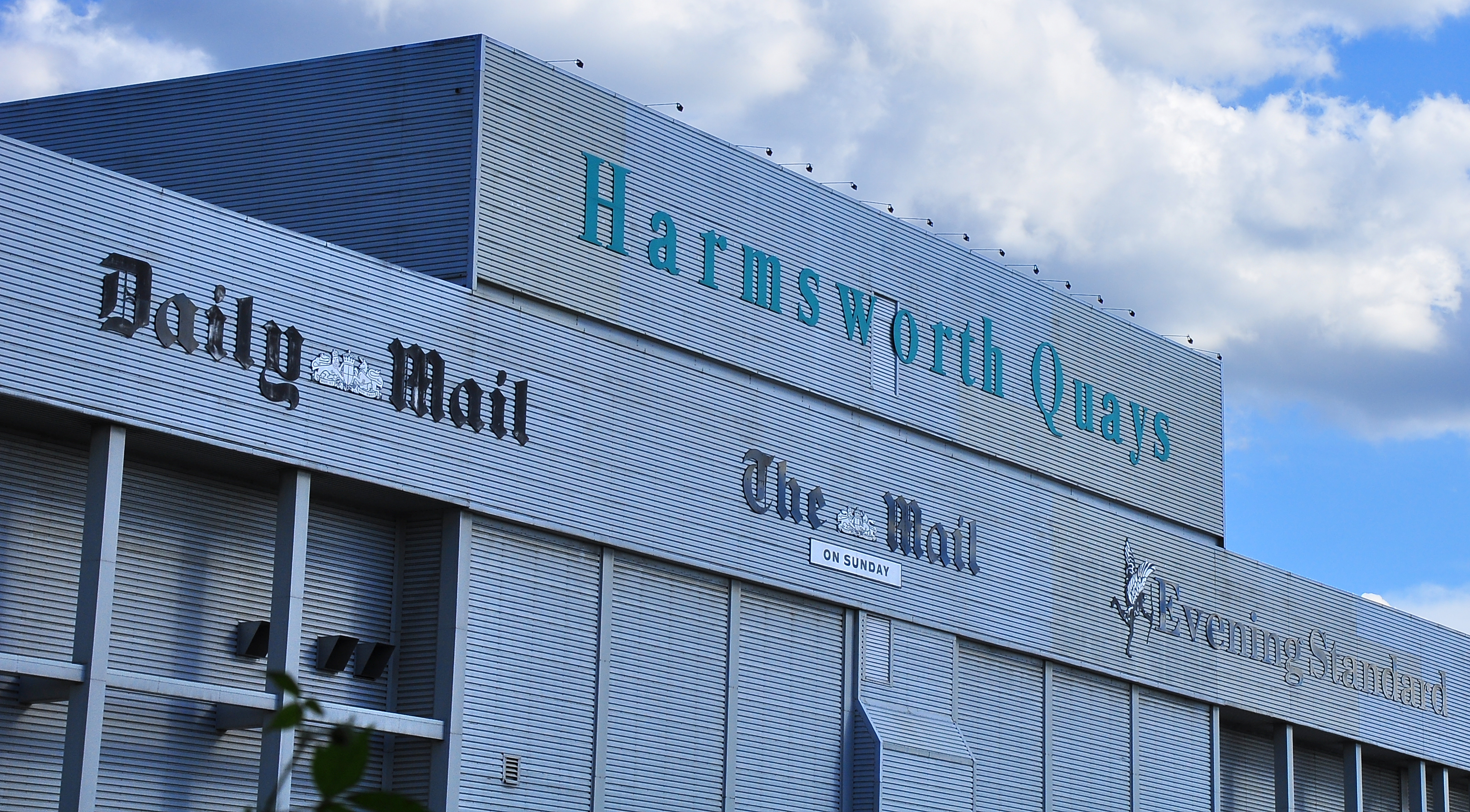
- Interactive map of Printworks
- Address: Surrey Quays Rd, London SE16 7PJ; London; United Kingdom
- Location: Rotherhithe, London, England
- Coordinates: 51.497482°N 0.043987°W
- Owner: Broadwick Live
- Capacity: 6,000
- Type: Nightclub

Construction
- Opened: 2017
- Closed: 1 May 2023

Website
- printworkslondon.co.uk

Printworks was a nightclub and events venue in Rotherhithe, South London. Taking its name from the building's former use for newspaper printing, it became one of the UK's top nightclubs. Closed for redevelopment in 2023, the Press Halls section of the building is scheduled to reopen as a music and events venue in 2026.

== History ==
Printworks was located in the former Harmsworth Quays printing plant, which printed newspapers including the Daily Mail and Evening Standard until 2012.

Some features of the printing plant were retained including the van loading dock and metal stairs, creating an industrial feel in the club. The premises had an overall capacity of 6,000 people across two performance rooms: the Press Halls and Inkwells (formerly known as the Darkroom). The site was also available for hire and was used for events, movies and commercials.

== Artists, music and perception ==
The venue opened in 2017 with an event by Seth Troxler, The Martinez Brothers and Loco Dice. It primarily focused on electronic music, but had hosted other genres such as orchestral music.

Printworks was described by Mixmag as "the saviour London clubbing desperately needed" and as "one of the most striking venues the capital city, if not the country, has to offer". The venue was repeatedly voted into the "Top 100 Clubs" list by the readers of DJ Magazine.

The venue followed a template similar to that of The Warehouse Project, where events were run (around 20) in seasons - for a period of weeks (around 13), but not throughout the full year. Generally, SS (spring and summer) ran from February until April, then AW runs from September until December, with occasional special events, such as New Year's Eve and bank holidays.

== Closure and redevelopment of the area ==
In autumn 2021, the owners of the site, British Land, submitted plans to Southwark Council to redevelop the site into office buildings which would involve the demolition of the Printworks venue. This was widely opposed by the music community as destruction of a key part of London's music scene. In 2022, the plans were approved, meaning 2023 will be the last season for music events in the venue after outcry from the community saved the venue.

The team opened a new venue in East London, called The Beams, in October 2022.

Printworks held its final event on 1 May 2023. During the event, the organisers announced Printworks 2.0 which they are planning to reopen some time in 2026. In the final year before its closure, Printworks came second in DJ Mag's top 100 global clubs award.

In February 2024, British Land and the architects Hawkins\Brown unveiled plans to reinstate and create a permanent music venue in one half of the large former Printworks building (the Press Halls). The other half, named The Grand Press, would be used for sustainable workspace and retail. The new spaces are scheduled to open in 2026.

== Appearances ==
=== Film ===
Year	Film
2015	Avengers: Age of Ultron
2022	The Batman

=== Music videos ===
Year	Video	Artist	Notes
2018	Free Yourself	The Chemical Brothers	
2020	Studio 2054	Dua Lipa	Livestream concert for the album Future Nostalgia
2021	You’ve Done Enough	Gorgon City (with DRAMA)	

=== TV series ===
Year	TV series	Notes
2020	Taskmaster	Series 10, used for some tasks
2022	Jimmy Carr Destroys Art	Channel 4 40th birthday
2024	The Gentlemen	Episode two, for boxing fight scenes

== Awards and nominations ==
=== DJ Magazine's top 100 clubs ===
Year	Position	Notes
2018	14	New entry
2019	9	
2020	5	
2021	7	
2022	4	
2023	2	

== See also ==
- Drumsheds
