= Death trajectory =

Pattern of dying when given a projected death date

Death trajectory refers to the pattern of dying when a patient is given a projected death date with limited or no medical recourse for the remaining existence of the individual's life. The death trajectory is dependent on the cause of death, whether it is sudden death, chronic illness, or the steady decline in health due to senescence (aging). Death trajectory is analyzed in two separate aspects: duration and shape. Duration refers to the period of time a patient has to live, which can be anywhere from imminent death to several months. Shape refers to how that duration is then graphed. In other words, the shape is "the course of dying, its predictability, and whether death is expected or unexpected".

Illustration of the premature death trajectory. There is a sharp decline in human function in a short period of time.

Dying trajectories were first studied in the 1960s by two researchers, Barney Glaser and Anselm Strauss, in an attempt to understand the end of human life from different ailments, including cancer.

== Sudden death trajectory ==
Sudden or premature death occurs when the death of an individual is not perceived to be imminent. In a sudden death trajectory, an otherwise healthy and high-functioning individual will suddenly and unexpectedly die without any observable indications of oncoming demise. People are at a high or normal level of functioning until the moment of death occurs. These types of deaths include fatal accidents and inconspicuous health issues like myocardial infarction or severe stroke. Deaths that align with a sudden death trajectory may happen over the course of a few days or in a matter of seconds.

== Chronic malady trajectory ==
A chronic malady trajectory showing an overall decline in health with intermittent rises and falls in human function.

The chronic malady trajectory occurs with types of death caused by autoimmune diseases such as HIV or other incurable illnesses. This process of death is characterized by an overall decline in health accompanied by acute crises and intermittent recoveries. The chronic malady trajectory projects emotional stress or turmoil; the patient may eventually become mentally and emotionally exhausted.

== Natural death trajectory ==
A typical natural death trajectory chronicling a long, steady decline in health over time.

A natural death trajectory is typically a long, steady decline due to old age. In these cases, the death trajectory is based on how the mind and body degenerate, including the speed of organ failure. In these cases, it is much easier to anticipate a person's death.

== Medical care ==
When someone has an estimated death date and a death trajectory, the patient's caregivers generally cease curative care and proceed to provide palliative or comfort care. Curative care refers to situations where the patient still feels it is possible to use current medical care to recover or become stable enough to carry on with life. Comfort care, or hospice care, is reserved for patients who acknowledge they will not be able to recover.

== See also ==
- Aging-associated diseases
- Palliative care
