= Casual =

Casual or Casuals may refer to:

- Casual wear, a loosely defined dress code
  - Business casual a loosely defined dress code
  - Smart casual a loosely defined dress code
- Casual Company, term used by the United States military to describe a type of formation.
- Casual employment, an employment classification
- Casual (subculture), a British football hooligan trend which emerged in the early 1980s
- Casuals F.C. (1883–1939), a football club
- Casual (TV series) (2015–2018), an American comedy-drama series

== Music ==
- Casual (rapper) (born 1973), American rapper
- The Casuals, a 1961–1976 British pop group
- Original Casuals, previously The Casuals, a 1950s American doo-wop group
- "Casual" (Chappell Roan song), 2022
- "Casual", a song by Doja Cat from Amala, 2018
- "Casual", a song by Hieroglyphics from 3rd Eye Vision, 1998

== See also ==
- Casual game
- Casualty (disambiguation)
