= Drumsheds =

Large nightclub and events venue in Tottenham, London

Coordinates: 51.6080°N 0.0468°W

- Interactive map of Drumsheds
- Location: London, England
- Owner: Broadwick
- Capacity: 15,000
- Type: Nightclub

Construction
- Opened: 2023

Website
- drumshedslondon.com

Drumsheds is a large-scale nightclub and events venue located in Edmonton in the London Borough of Enfield in the United Kingdom. It is housed in a former IKEA flagship store and has a capacity of 15,000 people.

The venue is near the North Circular Road, and the nearest railway station is Meridian Water railway station on the Lea Valley lines. Pymmes Brook runs nearby.

== History ==
IKEA operated their Tottenham store at the location from 2005 until August 2022, leaving behind 608,000 sq ft warehouse space. In July 2023, Broadwick Live announced it had secured a lease and would be converting the space into a live music venue, following the establishment of The Cause nearby.

An earlier venue called Drumsheds, now closed, operated at a different location on the River Lee Navigation.

== Licence ==
Following a number of incidents in 2024, the venue's license for alcohol sales is under review.

== See also ==
- Printworks
