= Causality (video game) =

2017 puzzle video game

- Developer: Loju
- Publisher: Loju
- Engine: Unity
- Platforms: Windows, macOS, Linux, iOS, Android
- Release: Windows; February 2, 2017; iOS, Android; February 13, 2017
- Genre: Puzzle
- Mode: Single-player

Causality is a 2017 puzzle game developed by the British studio Loju. In the game, the player guides astronauts to safety using squares. It was released on Steam and for iOS in February 2017.

== Gameplay ==
In Causality, the player must guide a group of astronauts to safety, using directional cues, portals, and time manipulation. Each astronaut moves automatically to colored end spaces, and the player has to complete the level in a certain time frame. During a level, the player can rewind time to change any squares and may hit a restart button that allows them to start the level from the beginning.

== Reception ==
Reception

Aggregate score
Aggregator	Score
Metacritic	87/100

Review scores
Publication	Score
Pocket Gamer	4.5/5
TouchArcade	4.5/5

On Metacritic, Causality received a "generally favorable" score of 87 based on four critics. Multiple critics gave positive reviews.
