= Causation =

Causation may refer to:

== Philosophy ==
- Causality, a relationship that describes and analyses cause and effect

== Physics ==
- Causality (physics)

== Law ==
- Causation (law), a key component to establish liability in both criminal and civil law
- Proximate cause, the basis of liability in negligence in the United States
- Causation in English law, defines the requirement for liability in negligence

== Language ==
- "Correlation does not imply causation", phrase used in the sciences and statistics

== Sociology ==
- Causation (sociology), the belief that events or actions can directly produce change in another variable in a predictable and observable manner

== Other uses ==
- Proximate causation, the direct reason behind an event occurring

== See also ==
- Causality (disambiguation)
- Cause (disambiguation)
