= Academic audit =

Term used in academia

In academia, an audit is an educational term for the completion of a course of study for which no assessment of the performance of the student is made nor grade awarded. Some institutions may record a grade of "audit" to those who have elected not to receive a letter grade for a course in which they are typically awarded.

In this case, 'audit' indicates that the individual merely has received teaching, rather than being evaluated as having achieved a given standard of knowledge of the subject. The term 'audit' is Latin, translating as, 'he/she hears'. In other words, the audit student has experienced the course, but has not been assessed.

Some students audit a class merely for enjoyment, including purposes of self-enrichment and academic exploration, with no need or desire of academic credit. Sometimes this technique is employed by individuals who wish to take a specific course without the risk of under-performance resulting in a poor or failing grade. This may be helpful when reviewing a long-unstudied subject, or when beginning or exploring the study of a discipline in which one has little experience or confidence.

Auditing is generally an option at institutions of higher learning, such as colleges and universities, rather than grammar school or secondary school.

== See also ==
- Academic administration
