= Humean definition of causality =

Causality as defined by David Hume

David Hume coined a sceptical, reductionist viewpoint on causality that inspired the logical-positivist definition of empirical law as "a regularity or universal generalization of the form 'All Cs are Es' or, whenever C, then E". The Scottish philosopher and economist believed that human mind is not equipped with the a priori ability to observe causal relations. Instead, all that can be experienced is one event following another. The reductionist approach to causation can be exemplified with the case of two billiard balls: one ball is moving, hits another one and stops, and the second ball is moving.

In A Treatise of Human Nature Hume coined two definitions of the cause in a following way:

We may define a CAUSE to be An object precedent and contiguous to another, and where all the objects resembling the former are placed in like relations of precedency and contiguity to those objects that resemble the latter.

...

A CAUSE is an object precedent and contiguous to another, and so united with it, that the idea, of the one determines the mind to form the idea of the other, and the impression of the one to form a more lively idea of the other.

also fixed eight general rules that can help in recognizing which objects are in cause-effect relation, the main four are as following:

(1) The cause and effect must be contiguous in space and time.

(2) The cause must be prior to the effect.

(3) There must be a constant union betwixt the cause and effect. [...]

(4) The same cause always produces the same effect, and the same effect never arises but from the same cause.

[...]

== See also ==
- Humeanism
