= Cause and effect (disambiguation) =

Cause and effect is the principle of causality, establishing one event or action as the direct result of another.

Cause and effect may also refer to:

- Cause and effect, a central concept of Buddhism; see Karma in Buddhism
- Cause and effect, the statistical concept and test, see Granger causality
- Cause and effect, the graphical method in quality control engineering, see Ishikawa diagram

== TV ==
- "Cause and Effect" (Star Trek: The Next Generation), a 1992 fifth-season episode of Star Trek: The Next Generation
- "Cause and Effect" (Numbers), the season finale of the sixth season of the American television show Numbers
- "Cause and Effect" (Robin Hood), the second episode of the third series of the BBC's drama Robin Hood
- "Cause and Effect" (The Flash), an episode of The Flash

== Music ==
- Cause and Effect (band), an American electronic/synthpop band, or their self-titled 1990 album
- The Cause & Effect, a 2007 album by D. Black
- Cause and Effect (Digital Summer album), a 2007 album by Digital Summer
- Cause and Effect (Maria Mena album), a 2008 album by Maria Mena
- Cause and Effect (Keane album), a 2019 album by Keane
- Cause an Effect, a 2006 album by N'fa
- Cause and Effect, a 2002 album by Human Drama
