= The Cause (London) =

Nightclub in London, England

- Interactive map of The Cause
- Location: London, England
- Type: Nightclub

Construction
- Opened: 2018

Website
- Official website

The Cause is a nightclub in Greater London.

Stuart Glen and Eugene Wild first opened The Cause in Tottenham Hale in 2018 and became known for promoting DIY acts alongside a community garden and cafe. This was by a temporary arrangement with the landowner and the original venue closed in 2022, having hosted Derrick Carter and other notable DJs.

The venue reopened at 60 Dock Road, Silvertown, in 2023 and has hosted acts including Evian Christ, Masters at Work and Hiroko Yamamura.
