= Cause (disambiguation) =

A cause is the source of, or reason for, an event or action; that which produces or effects a result.

Cause may also refer to:

== Relationships between events ==
- Cause and effect, a relationship between one event and another

== Law ==
- Cause, a lawsuit
- Just cause (employment law)
- Probable cause
- Show cause

== Other uses ==
- Cause, such as a social cause, a pursuit, belief, or purpose of one or more people, that they advocate for, or donate or share resources to support or advance, e.g.,: a(n)
  - Belief in something
  - Ethical ideal (principles or value)
- Causes (company), an online company
- Cause (medicine)
- Cause (river), in Bouches-du-Rhône, southern France
- "Cause", a song by Rodriguez from the album Coming from Reality

== See also ==
- Caus Castle, Shropshire, England
- Causation in law
