= Hrafnhildur Hanna Ragnarsdóttir =

Icelandic academic

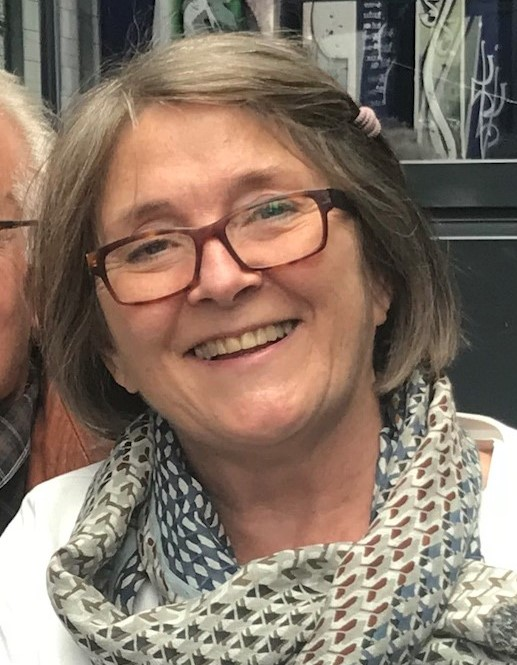
- Born: 1948 (age 77–78)
- Occupations: professor emerita in Development and Educational Science at the University of Iceland

Hrafnhildur Hanna Ragnarsdóttir (born 1948) is professor emerita in Developmental and Educational Science at the University of Iceland. Her research is concerned with long-term language development and its relation to cognition, social-emotional development and literacy. Her primary research focus has been on the development of vocabulary, grammar, and narratives in early childhood and the first school years and on later language development as it appears in oral vs/written text construction and in narratives vs/expository texts from middle grades through adolescence and into adulthood. She received her PhD in Psychology and Educational Science from Université d’Aix-Marseille in 1990.

== Education ==
Hrafnhildur completed her matriculation examination from Menntaskólinn í Reykjavík (Reykjavik Higher Secondary Grammar School) in 1968. The same year she received a scholarship from Macalester College, St. Paul, Minnesota, where she studied English and American literature. From 1969 to 1976 and again from 1985 to 1990, she studied at Université d’Aix-Marseille, with a grant from the French State and completed her licence ès lettres 1973, Maîtrise de Psychologie 1974, Diplôme d’Études Approfondies 1985 and a PhD in Psychology and Educational Science in 1990.

== Professional experience ==
In 1974, Hrafnhildur began working at the Iceland University of Education (IUE, later the University of Iceland), first as a part-time teacher, later as an assistant professor (from 1976), associate professor and, finally, professor in Developmental and Educational Science from 1990 until she retired in 2018. Her main subjects were developmental psychology in particular language development in childhood and adolescence - and their implications for literacy and education. Her administrative positions include being vice rector, the first dean of graduate studies at the IUE and the first director of the IUE Research Centre (1991–96). She was elected teachers’ representative on IUE's School Council, which later became the University of Iceland's School of Education. After the merger of IUE and the University of Iceland in 2007, she, along with others, founded the Research Centre on Language, Literacy and Development and has since been its director.

== Research administration ==
Hrafnhildur was appointed to the Boards of the Icelandic Science Council, of the Science Council and of the Icelandic Centre for Research on behalf of the humanities and social sciences. She was Iceland's representative on the European Science Foundation Standing Committee for the Social Sciences (ESF-SCSS) and on the boards of the Joint Committee for Nordic Research Councils for the Humanities and the Social Sciences (NOS-HS) as well as of the ERANET New Opportunities for Research Funding Collaboration in the Social Sciences (NORFACE, vice chair in 2004). She has been Iceland's representative on the management committees of three European research networks under the auspices of the EU: COST A8: Concerted Research Action on Learning Disorders as a Barrier to Human Development, COST IS0207: The European Research Network on Learning to Write Effectively (ERN-LWE) (Financial Rapporteur 2010 and 2011), and European Literacy Network (ELN). In addition to advancing increased collaboration of scholars in the field of language development and literacy in Europe, these networks have all specifically focused on research training, mobility, and educational opportunities for doctoral students and young researchers.

== Research ==
=== Main research emphases ===
Hrafnhildur's main research emphases can be summarized as follows:

- Language development is a long-term process, ranging from infancy to adulthood. It is strongly influenced by input and environmental factors.
- Language development, cognition and social-emotional development are intertwined and together they form the foundation of literacy, in particular reading comprehension and writing, and as a result, lead to academic achievement.
- Language is context dependent. It is therefore important to use different methods and combine different kinds of data in research on language and language development, such as recordings of children's spontaneous language under normal conditions as well as experiments and observations under standardised conditions, longitudinal as well as cross-sectional studies, language use in different modalities, and comparisons of the language development of children learning different languages.

=== Selected research projects directed by Hrafnhildur ===
- Development in early childhood: Self-regulation, language development, and literacy from four to eight years of age. A longitudinal study where over 270 children in two age-groups, four and six-year-old at the beginning of study, were followed up annually for three years (2009–2011) with a broad range of assessments. The main goal was to provide an overview of developmental changes in vocabulary, grammar, narrative proficiency, listening comprehension, emotion understanding, self-regulation, linguistic awareness and various literacy skills among children over this important developmental period, and to investigate how these factors interact and predict later academic achievement. Principal investigator Hrafnhildur Ragnarsdóttir, co-directors Freyja Birgisdóttir and Steinunn Gestsdóttir. Funded by the Icelandic Centre for Research (RANNIS) and the University of Iceland's Research Fund.
- Language development between ages four and nine and its relation to academic performance (Icelandic National Examination) in 4th grade. Hrafnhildur's follow-up of the younger group of children from the above described study, extended the longitudinal data for this group from three to six consecutive years. Funded by the University of Iceland Research Fund.
- Development of text production in different genres and different modalities in childhood through adolescence to adulthood. Study of language development (vocabulary, grammar, syntax, etc.) and language use for text construction (structure, coherence, discourse stance, etc.) in four age groups: ages 11, 14, and 17 and adults (age-range 26-40), as manifested in two different text types – narratives and expositories – and in spoken compared to written modalities. This research is the Icelandic part of a seven-country comparative study Developing literacy in different contexts and different languages (Project manager Ruth Berman), supported by The Spencer Foundation. Continuing research on the Icelandic part of the project has received grants from RANNIS (The Icelandic Centre for Research) and the University of Iceland Research Fund.
- The language proficiency of children on the boundaries of preschool and primary school (ages three to eight/nine). Various research projects, funded by RANNIS, NOS-HS, Iceland University of Education and the University of Iceland research funds. Examples:
1. The subject of Hrafnhildur's doctoral thesis was Icelandic children's acquisition of the meaning of words and concepts about family relations. She later extended this research to include a cross-linguistic comparison with children from a closely related language (and culture) – Denmark. Since Danish children do not experience the same linguistic transparency in family names and some other kinship terms as the Icelandic ones provide, this allowed her to explore of the effect of different linguistic information on three to eight-year-old children's understanding of words and concepts on family relations.
2. Children's acquisition of inflectional morphology. How does diversely complex past tense inflections of Nordic languages affect 4- to 8-year-old children's assimilation of them? A cross-linguistic study.
3. What are children's narrative skills around the time they start school?
- A comparative study of the narrative skills of 3-, 5-, 7-, 9-, 12- and 15-year-olds and adults.
- Icelandic Child and Adult Language Corpus. Audio recordings and computerized language data transcribed in accordance with the CHAT system in CHILDES.
1. 65 transcribed audio recordings (60–90 minutes each) of three Icelandic children in interaction with their family in their homes. Age range two to six.
2. >600 transcribed stories told orally by storytellers from three years of age to adults and ≈300 written stories by children and adults. All texts are based on the same non-word picture story.
3. 120 elicited narratives by six-year-old Icelandic children for the Multilingual Assessment Instrument for Narratives (MAIN).
4. 320 written and spoken texts (160 narratives, 160 expository texts) of 11-, 14-, and 17-year-olds and adults (The Spencer Project, see above). The spoken texts were audio recorded and the written ones entered on the computer with the Scriptlog program. All the texts are transcribed and coded in accordance with CHAT.

=== International research collaboration ===
From the beginning of her career, Hrafnhildur has been active in international research collaboration of scholars in the field of developmental psychology, language development and literacy. She participated in international research on children's narrative skills in the 1980s and the 1990s under the direction of Ruth Berman and Dan Slobin in the Berkeley Cross-linguistic Language Acquisition Project. Since 1993, she has been a member of CHILDES, the child language component of the TalkBank System at Carnegie-Mellon University and of the International Association for the Study of Child Language (IASCL) since 1993, elected to the executive board of IASCL from 2014 to 2020.

In the 1990s, Hrafnhildur was active in launching an initiative of comparative research on the language acquisition of Nordic children. She was one of two managers of the Nordic Language Acquisition Research Initiative (supported by NorFA) and organised, for example, an international conference in Reykjavik “Learning to talk about time and space”. She was also one of two instigators of the research programme “Language Acquisition: a Scandinavian Perspective”, supported by NOS-H and a co- organizer of European Summer School: The crosslinguistic study of language acquisition: an integrated approach for doctoral students and “post-docs” supported by NorFa and the EU in 1999, as well as of an international conference “Language and Cognition in Language Acquisition” in Odense the same year. She was the Icelandic PI of a collaborative research project of four Nordic countries, Språkutveckling och läsinlärning, which was supported by NOS-S and linked to the European project COST A8 (see above). Since 2000, Hrafnhildur has been the project manager of the Icelandic part of a seven-country comparative research project “Developing Literacy in Different Contexts and Different Languages” supported by The Spencer Foundation and The Icelandic Centre for Research. In addition to the research part of the project, this group has organised workshops and conferences and has strong ties to the European networks of scholars on language development, writing and literacy mentioned above (for more detail, see the section on research projects).

Hrafnhildur has been a visiting scholar at many universities in Europe and the United States, most often at Harvard Graduate School of Education, but also at U.C. Berkeley, New Mexico, and Stanford Universities in the US, and at Oslo University, the University of Copenhagen, University of Gothenburg, Oxford University and the Sorbonne in Europe. She has given lectures on her research at a myriad of scientific conferences and symposiums in Iceland and abroad and organised international conferences on child language and literacy research . Examples include “Learning to talk about time and space” (Reykjavík 1994), “Language and Cognition in Language Acquisition” (Odense, 1997), “Reading, writing and language development in the school years” (Varmaland, 1999). To celebrate Hrafnhildur's retirement in 2018, the Research Centre for Language and Literacy development organized an international conference, Building bridges and boosting literacy from preschool to adolescence, at the University of Iceland.

Since 2014, Hrafnhildur has worked with an international team of child language scholars developing tools to assess bi- and multilingual children's language skills using same tasks in both/all their languages. The final version of Hrafnhildur's adaptation of the Multilingual Assessment Instruments for Narratives (MAIN) for Icelandic appeared in 2020.

== Diverse collaborative work and projects ==
Hrafnhildur has participated in several language and literacy intervention projects for native and immigrant children in Icelandic pre- and elementary schools and given lectures for parents, teachers and other professionals at all schooling levels. She has also collaborated with The Communication Centre for the Deaf and Hard of Hearing and with Málefli, an interest group for children with speech and language development challenges. Among other things, Hrafnhildur and collaborators wrote a report for the Ministry of Education, Science and Culture (2012) on the status of children and adolescents with speech and language disorders.

== Personal life ==
Hrafnhildur's parents are Ragnar Á. Magnússon, chartered accountant (1917–1988) and Svanlaug I. Gunnlaugsdóttir, housewife (1920–1978). Hrafnhildur is married to Pétur Gunnarsson, writer. They have two sons: Dagur Kári, film director, and Gunnar Þorri, literary scholar and translator.
