= Anat Ninio =

Psychology professor (born 1944)

- ענת ניניו
- Born: August 10, 1944 (age 82)
- Education: Hebrew University of Jerusalem
- Occupation: Psychologist

Anat Ninio (Hebrew: ענת ניניו; born August 10, 1944) is a professor emeritus of psychology at the Hebrew University of Jerusalem. She specializes in the interactive context of language acquisition, the communicative functions of speech, pragmatic development, and syntactic development.

Ninio is best known for her work on joint picture-book reading of parents and young children; for developing the widely used Ninio and Wheeler and INCA-A taxonomies of communicative acts; and for her work on syntactic development, combining learning theory with the Chomskyan Minimalist Program. She has published four books, and over a hundred peer-referenced papers, book chapters and conference presentations. Her Erdős number is 4.

== Biography ==
Ninio received a B.A. with majors in Statistics and English Linguistics from the Hebrew University of Jerusalem in 1965, and an additional B.A. in psychology in 1969, from the same university. As a graduate student, she studied cognitive psychology with Daniel Kahneman the future Nobel laureate, receiving an M.A. in 1970 and a Ph.D. in 1974, all from the Hebrew University. She spent a post-doctoral year at the University of Oxford in 1975/76 with Jerome Bruner, specializing in the social interactionist theory of language acquisition.

Ninio was appointed a lecturer in Psychology at the Hebrew University in 1976, was promoted to senior lecturer in 1982, to associate professor in 1989, and to full professor in 1994. Since 2012 she is a professor emeritus. She held the endowed chair of Joseph H. and Belle R. Braun Professor in Psychology at Hebrew University. She served in various administrative capacities at the Hebrew University, among them as the Chair of the Graduate Developmental Program, Chair of the Department of Psychology, Chair of the Sturman Human Development Center, and Director of the Martin and Vivian Levin Center for the Normal and Psychopathological Development of the Child and Adolescent. She also served as a visiting professor at Duke University, New York University, the New School for Social Research, New York, the University of Quebec at Montreal, Harvard University, Macquarie University, Sydney, Australia, the Graduate Center of the City University of New York and at the University of Pennsylvania. She served as a member of the executive committee of the International Association for the Study of Child Language (IASCL).

Ninio also published two Hebrew language poetry books, one under the pseudonym 'Ada Shimon.

== Joint picture-book reading of parents and young children ==
With Jerome Bruner and others, Ninio identified joint picture-book reading of parents and young children as an important early context for the acquisition of vocabulary and literacy skills, and described the processes of parental “scaffolding” that facilitate learning in this context. Reading with children is considered nowadays crucial for success in school and it is promoted by the U.S. Department of Education as “one of the most important things that parents can do to help their children become readers”.

== Taxonomies of communicative acts ==
With a postdoctoral student, Polly Wheeler, Ninio developed a three-layer taxonomy and coding system of verbal-communicative acts in mother-infant interaction, distinguishing speech acts, talk interchanges, and discourse functions. The taxonomy was built on the theoretical writings of Speech Act theorists such as John Searle and sociologists such as Erving Goffman, as well as on mothers' descriptions of videotaped interaction sessions in which they had participated. An abridged version of it (Inventory of Communicative Acts-Abridged, INCA-A), was prepared by Ninio for use by Catherine Snow, Barbara Pan, and colleagues at Harvard University in the research project “Foundations for Language Assessment in Spontaneous Speech” funded by the National Institutes of Health. The abridged version has been adopted as the official communicative coding system of the Child Language Data Exchange System (CHILDES) project. INCA-A has the same speech act codes but a less detailed repertoire of talk interchange codes than the full Ninio and Wheeler version. Both versions of the Ninio and Wheeler system are widely used in projects on English as well as Hebrew, Dutch, German, Irish, Italian, Spanish, Catalan, Romanian, Turkish, Japanese, Korean, Mandarin Chinese, and others. They are also used in research involving young adults, second language learners, peer conversations, children in the Head Start program, aphasics, autistic children, visually impaired children, and more.

== Syntactic development ==
Unexpectedly for an empiricist who emphasizes learning and the interactive context of acquisition, Ninio uses as her linguistic framework Chomsky's Minimalist Program alongside the formally analogous Dependency Grammar. The appeal to the binary combining operation Merge (or Dependency) and the use of grammatical relations as atomic units of analysis makes her work on syntactic development unusual in the field where many researchers prefer such holistic approaches as Construction Grammar, or else forsake linguistically oriented analyses in favor of statistical patterns to be found by automatic means. In her empirical work, Ninio employs the methods of corpus-based linguistics in order to characterize child-directed speech and young children's early multiword productions. In her study of the acquisition of the core grammatical relations of English, her research team constructed a 1.5 million words strong parental corpus and a 200,000 words strong child corpus, parsing them manually for the relevant syntactic relations.

In describing the development of language in children, Ninio adopts the concepts and methods of Complexity Science describing the process of acquisition as one in which young children join a complex network of speakers and speech as new participants in the network. In this theoretical model, children are likened to new users of the World-Wide Web who both use the WWW and also create it with their own productions The pragmatic uses of speech for communication among speakers are thus viewed not only as the background and context of acquisition but also as building blocks of connectivity in the complex system which is language.

== A proposal for a paradigm change in syntactic theory ==
In her work in the last few years, Ninio combines in a new way her interest in syntactic development with her long-term emphasis on the pragmatic context of the learning process. In her 2025 book Computing the sentence: A Relevance-theoretical model of syntactic development, she proposes that syntax is better conceptualized as instructions to generate and interpret sentences than the declarative rules used in the usual Chomskian grammars. Moreover, she suggests that programming languages may serve as successful heuristic models for the cognitive instructions used by humans in processing natural languages.In Chapter 4 of this book, she reports on several studies that apply such a descriptive method to young children’s development of syntax. These studies generate a new model of syntactic development by which young children use a strategy of trial-and-error in their mastery of adult syntax, gradually approximating the adult usage.
