= Social interactionist theory =

Explanation of language development

Social interactionist theory (SIT) is an explanation of language development emphasizing the role of social interaction between the developing child and linguistically knowledgeable adults. It is based largely on the socio-cultural theories of Soviet psychologist, Lev Vygotsky.

== Initial stages ==
Approach to language acquisition research has focused on three areas, namely the cognitive approach to language acquisition or the developmental cognitive theory of Jean Piaget, the information processing approach or the information processing model of Brian MacWhinney and Elizabeth Bates (the competition model), and the social interactionist approach or social interaction model of Lev Vygotsky (socio-cultural theory). Although the initial research was essentially descriptive in an attempt to describe language development from the stand point of social development, more recently, researchers have been attempting to explain a few varieties of acquisition in which learner factors lead to differential acquisition by the process of socialization; called the theory of "social interactionist approach".

== Socio-cultural theory ==
Vygotsky, a psychologist and social constructivist, laid the foundation for the interactionists view of language acquisition. According to Vygotsky, social interaction plays an important role in the learning process and proposed the zone of proximal development (ZPD) where learners construct the new language through socially mediated interaction. Vygotsky's social-development theory was adopted and made prominent in the Western world though by Jerome Bruner who laid the foundations of a model of language development in the context of adult-child interaction.

Under the social interactionist approach, a child's language development occurs within the child's construction of a social world, also known as the "social-cognitive model". (Behaviorism, by contrast, emphasizes the role of stimulus-response conditioning in language acquisition.)

Under SIT, the deepest level of representation specifies the communicative intent primarily and semantic content secondarily. This approach to language acquisition theory combines the "traditional behavioral" approach and "linguistic-semantic" approach to language production. Under SIT, language acquisition is thought to occur differently than under other predominant theories. It emphasizes how environment shapes acquisition. This is more relevant with regard to children's acquisition than with adult acquisition. Two open questions remain for SIT. One, how does a child's knowledge change in the course of development? Two, how is- or how was- the existing language system of an adult formed?

Social integrationists describe a dynamic system where typically children cue their parents into supplying the appropriate language experience that children require for language advancement. In essence, it turns in supplying of supportive communicative structure that allows efficient communication despite its primitives. (By contrast, the behavioral approach posits that children are passive beneficiaries of the language training techniques employed by their parents. Also by contrast, the linguistic approach posits that children are active language processors of whose maturing neural systems guide development.)

== Current strand ==
Social-interactionists, such as Alison Gopnik, Andrew Meltzoff, Anat Ninio, Roy Pea, Catherine Snow, and Ernest Moerk theorize that interaction with adults plays an important part in children's language acquisition. However, some researchers such as Bambi B. Schieffelin and Elinor Ochs claim that the empirical data on which theories of social interactionism are based have often been over-representative of middle class American and European parent-child interactions. Anthropological studies of other human cultures, as well as low-educated Western families, suggests rather that many of the world's children are not spoken to in a manner documented for educated Western families, but nevertheless grow up to be fully fluent language users. Many researchers now take this into account in their analyses.

In addition, social interactionists criticize the claim made by Noam Chomsky according to which the linguistic input children are presented with by adults addressing them, is full of errors and discontinuities. Another argument of nativists on which interactionists provide contrary empirical evidence is the availability of negative feedback on, and corrections of, children's errors. Moerk (1994) conducted a meta-analysis of 40 studies and found substantial evidence that corrections do indeed play a role. From this work, corrections are not only abundant but contingent on the mistakes of the child. (see behavior analysis of child development).
