= Gina Conti-Ramsden =

Language scientist

- Occupation: Professor Emerita
- Known for: Manchester Language Study

Academic background
- Education: Kirkland College, Cambridge University, University of Texas at Dallas, University of Manchester

Academic work
- Discipline: Communication Disorders
- Institutions: University of Manchester

Gina Maria Conti-Ramsden (born February 13, 1957) is a distinguished language scientist whose work focuses on developmental language disorder (DLD) in children and young adults. She is a founding member of Raising Awareness of Developmental Language Disorder (RADLD), an international organization that advocates for people with DLD. Conti-Ramsden is a Fellow of the Royal College of Speech and Language Therapists. She is Professor Emerita in the Division of Human Communication, Development & Hearing at the University of Manchester where she directs the Manchester Language Study (MLS).

Conti-Ramsden's research contributions have garnered recognition in the field of communication disorders. She received an Honorary Doctorate from the Universidad Nacional de San Marcos (Division of Human Communication, Development & Hearing) in 2010, and was honored with a Lifetime Fellowship from the Colegio Psicólogos del Perú (Division of Human Communication, Development & Hearing) in 2019. She was named a fellow of the British Psychological Society in 2002 and a fellow of the Academy of Social Sciences in the same year. Her short film DLD 1-2-3, created in collaboration with RADLD researchers, was awarded the 2018 Charity Film of the Year by the Charity Film Awards. The film, produced with a budget of less than £10K, aims to raise awareness of children facing challenges with language development and communication skills.

== Biography ==
Gina Maria Conti-Ramsden, born on February 13, 1957, in Lima, Peru. She earned her B.S. degree from Kirkland College in 1977 and an M.A. in Philosophy from Cambridge University in 1978. She received a Ph.D. in Communication Disorders at the University of Texas at Dallas, under the guidance of Sandy Friel-Patti. Her early published work with Dr. Friel-Patti examined the dialogues of mother-child dyads with typically-developing and language-impaired children.

Conti-Ramsden was the vice-president of International Association for the Study of Child Language (IASCL) from 2002 to 2005 and its president of from 2005 t0 2008 She is a member of the advisory board of the Journal of Child Psychology and Psychiatry and was an associate editor of the journal First Language. She was a visiting researcher at the Murdoch Children's Research Institute.

== Research ==
Conti-Ramsden's research focuses on language and communication disorders in children, particularly DLD. Her work has contributed to early identification of language disorders in children, leading to improvements in early intervention and support for affected individuals and their families.

Conti-Ramsden was involved in the CATALISE study, a multinational and multidisciplinary Delphi consensus research project aimed at identifying language impairments in children. By engaging experts from diverse fields and countries, the study sought to establish a standardized framework of criteria and methods for identifying language impairments in children. This research contributed to increasing the accuracy and consistency in identifying language impairment, facilitating more effective interventions and support for affected children.

One of Conti-Ramsden's papers, "Developmental Trajectories of Verbal and Nonverbal Skills in Individuals With a History of Specific Language Impairment: From Childhood to Adolescence" won the 2013 Editor's Award in Journal of Speech, Language, and Hearing Research, given to the most meritorious article appearing in the Language section of their journal that year. The study focused on the developmental trajectories of verbal and nonverbal skills in individuals with a history of Specific Language Impairment (SLI) from childhood to adolescence (age 7 to 17 years). (Note that the term SLI was used widely prior to the adoption of DLD as a preferred diagnostic label.) While previous research had explored differences in language development between children with SLI and typically-developing peers, this study aimed to better understand how verbal and nonverbal skills evolve over time and whether there are consistent patterns of growth within subgroups of individuals with SLI.

Conti-Ramsden's research underscores the need for early identification and intervention in language disorders and the necessity of continuous support throughout an individual's life, as these disorders often endure into adolescence and adulthood. Moreover, her research has shed light on the economic and societal implications of language disorders, calling for proactive measures to address these issues. Additionally, her studies have examined the psycholinguistic development of children with DLD, identification of potential clinical markers for DLD, and psychosocial outcomes of children and young individuals with DLD, genetics and neurobiology of DLD, and the utilization of new media in addressing DLD-related challenges.

Conti-Ramsden has made her data publicly available through the CHILDES Talk Bank project, which include language transcripts of both typically-developing and language-impaired children.

=== The Manchester Language Study ===
Conti-Ramsden and her fellow researchers collaborated on an ESRC-funded project focused on examining language impairment in adulthood. This study investigated the personal and social well-being of individuals with a history of language impairment and their ability to participate and interact within their communities. This work was an extension of the longitudinal Manchester Language Study, which was conducted in collaboration with the University College Hospital Biomedical Research Centre. The Manchester Language Study spanned approximately 20 years, and followed children diagnosed with DLD from childhood into early adulthood.

One of Conti-Ramsden's high-impact studies is "The Manchester Language Study initial cohort: seven year old data for children with developmental language disorders attending language units in England 1995-1997." Through this research, the authors found that even with support, children with DLD often found it difficult to cope with mainstream education, and they benefitted from structured small-group classroom environments with intensive language instruction. It revealed that DLD is a persistent condition that affects individuals beyond childhood, highlighting the need for ongoing support and intervention.

== Representative publications ==
- Conti-Ramsden, G. (2003). Processing and linguistic markers in young children with specific language impairment (SLI). Journal of Speech, Language, and Hearing Research 46(5), 1029-1037.
- Conti-Ramsden, G., & Botting, N. (1999). Classification of children with specific language impairment: Longitudinal considerations. Journal of Speech, Language, and Hearing Research, 42(5), 1195-1204.
- Conti‐Ramsden, G., Botting, N., & Faragher, B. (2001). Psycholinguistic markers for specific language impairment (SLI). Journal of Child Psychology and Psychiatry, 42(6), 741-748.
- Conti-Ramsden, G., Crutchley, A., & Botting, N. (1997). The extent to which psychometric tests differentiate subgroups of children with SLI. Journal of Speech, Language, and Hearing Research, 40(4), 765-777.
- Conti-Ramsden, G., St Clair, M. C., Pickles, A., & Durkin, K. (2012). Developmental trajectories of verbal and nonverbal skills in individuals with a history of specific language impairment: from childhood to adolescence. Journal of Speech, Language, and Hearing Research, 55(6), 1716-1735.
- St Clair, M. C., Pickles, A., Durkin, K., & Conti-Ramsden, G. (2011). A longitudinal study of behavioral, emotional and social difficulties in individuals with a history of specific language impairment (SLI). Journal of Communication Disorders, 44(2), 186-199.

== Books ==
- Beveridge, M., Conti-Ramsden, G. & Leudar, I. (1997). Language and Communication in People with Learning Disabilities. Routledge.
- Conti-Ramsden, G. & Snow, C. E. (1990). Children's Language, Volume 7. Psychology Press.
- McTear, M. & Conti-Ramsden, G. (2007). Pragmatic Disability in Children: Assessment and Intervention. Wiley.
- Pereira, M.P. & Conti-Ramsden, G. (1999). Language Development and Social Interaction in Blind Children. Psychology Press.

== Child language corpora ==
- Conti-Ramsden Corpus 1 in the Child Language Data Exchange System (CHILDES))
- Conti-Ramsden Corpus 2 in CHILDES
- Conti-Ramsden Corpus 3 in CHILDES
- Conti-Ramsden Corpus 4 in CHILDES
