= CLAN program =

CLAN (Computerized Language Analysis)
- Developers: Brian MacWhinney, Leonid Spektor
- Stable release: 28-Mar-2021 11:00 / March 28, 2021; 4 years ago
- Operating system: Microsoft Windows, Linux, macOS
- Type: Qualitative data analysis
- License: GPL2 license
- Website: dali.talkbank.org/clan/

The CLAN (Computerized Language ANalysis) program is a cross-platform program designed by Brian MacWhinney and written by Leonid Spektor for the purpose of creating and analyzing transcripts in the Child Language Exchange System (CHILDES) database. CLAN is open source software and can be freely downloaded.

== History ==
From 1984 until 2000, CLAN was used exclusively for the analysis of child language data. However, beginning with the funding of the TalkBank system by the National Science Foundation (NSF) in 2000, the scope of CLAN has broadened. CLAN is now being used to create and analyze a wide variety of corpora in the context of these databanks: CHILDES for child language, AphasiaBank for aphasia, PhonBank for phonology, FluencyBank for fluency disorders, HomeBank for daylong recordings in the home, and SLABank for second language acquisition. The TalkBank website also provides data for seven other spoken language banks dealing with CA (Conversation Analysis), RHD (right hemisphere damage), TBI (traumatic brain injury), LangBank (classical languages), ClassBank (classroom interactions), SamtaleBank (Danish), and BilingBank (bilingualism).

== Features ==
All the data in each of these banks is formatted in the CHAT transcription format which is designed for analysis by CLAN. The CLAN programs include facilities in five different domains:

1. CLAN includes an editor that focuses on the creation of links between words and utterances in the transcript and segment of the related audio or video media. CLAN provides four methods to facilitate this process. The SoundWalker facility emulates the back and forth actions of a transcribers foot pedal, but using keystrokes. Sonic CHAT provides careful segment link from a waveform. Transcriber mode uses the pressing of a space bar after the completion of an utterance to facilitate transcription, and finally time marks can be edited and produced by hand entry.
2. CLAN provides all the basic tools of corpus analysis such as key-word and line, concordance, frequency counting, partial regular expression search, and so on.
3. CLAN provides additional analysis programs for between-speak contingency patterns, utterance and word length, cooccurrence clusters, and so on.
4. For Qualitative Data Analysis CLAN has program such as GEM for marking special segments of text, Coder's Editor for applying a coding system, CA format for Jeffersonian CA transcription.
5. To support the use of TalkBank data in the clinical setting, CLAN includes programs like EVAL and KIDEVAL that compare individual subject and groups with a large comparison database in one or more of the TalkBank corpora databases.
