= Shanley Allen =

Linguist

- Born: 1964 (age 61–62)
- Occupation: Professor of linguistics
- Employer: Technical University of Kaiserslautern

Shanley E. M. Allen (born 1964) is a professor of linguistics working at the Technical University of Kaiserslautern. Her research is primarily in the area of psycholinguistics and language acquisition, studying both monolingual and multilingual speakers. She is also a specialist on the Inuktitut language.

== Biography ==
Allen initially studied Hispanic Studies at McGill University, graduating with a B.A. in 1985. She earned her PhD at McGill in 1994, writing her dissertation on Acquisition of some mechanisms of transitivity alternation in Arctic Quebec Inuktitut under the supervision of Lydia White.

She took up a position as research scientist at the Max Planck Institute for Psycholinguistics, Nijmegen from 1994-1998. In 1999, Allen took up a position as assistant professor in the School of Education at Boston University, becoming promoted to associate professor in 2002. She moved to Germany in 2010 to take up a W2 professorship at Kaiserslautern, and since 2012 she has been full professor (W3) and leader of the Psycholinguistics and Language Development Group there.

== Honors and awards ==
Allen has been the recipient of various awards, honours and grants. Her doctoral dissertation was awarded the Mary R. Haas Book Award by the Society for the Study of the Indigenous Languages of the Americas in 1995. Between 2010 and 2016 she was the recipient of a Dual Career Professorship awarded by the Claussen-Simon Foundation, covering half of her professorial salary for six years.

Since 2018 she has been one of the principal investigators on the Research Unit ‘Emerging Grammars in Language Contact Situations: A Comparative Approach’ (RUEG), along with Heike Wiese, Artemis Alexiadou, Natalia Gagarina, Anke Lüdeling, Christoph Schroeder, Luka Szucsich, Rosemarie Tracy, and Sabine Zerbian.

In 2020 she was elected as a Member of the Academia Europaea.

In 2024 she was elected as a President of The International Association for the Study of Child Language (IASCL).

== Research ==
Allen's work in psycholinguistics investigates the extent to which first language development is affected by cross-linguistic differences in morphosyntactic structure, the universality of language learning, and interactions between languages in multilingual speakers. Inuktitut has been at the centre of much of her research since her dissertation, but she has also worked on Basque, English, German, Japanese and Spanish. Her research employs a variety of empirical methods, including elicited production, eye-tracking, self-paced reading tasks, and naturalistic observation.

== Selected publications ==
- Allen, Shanley. 1996. Aspects of argument structure acquisition in Inuktitut. Amsterdam: John Benjamins. ISBN 9789027299154
- Allen, Shanley, and Martha B. Crago. 1996. Early passive acquisition in Inuktitut. Journal of Child Language 23, 129–155.
- Allen, Shanley. 2000. A discourse-pragmatic explanation for argument representation in child Inuktitut. Linguistics 38, 483–521.
- Allen, Shanley, and Heike Schröder. 2003. Preferred argument structure in early Inuktitut spontaneous speech data. In John W. Du Bois, Lorraine E. Kumpf, and William J. Ashby (eds.), Preferred Argument Structure: Grammar as architecture for function, 301–338. Amsterdam: John Benjamins.
- Özyürek, Aslı, Sotaro Kita, Shanley Allen, Reyhan Furman, and Amanda Brown. 2005. How does linguistic framing of events influence co-speech gestures?: Insights from crosslinguistic variations and similarities. Gesture 5, 219–240.
- Allen, Shanley, Aslı Özyürek, Sotaro Kita, Amanda Brown, Reyhan Furman, Tomoko Ishizuka, and Mihoko Fujii. 2007. Language-specific and universal influences in children's syntactic packaging of Manner and Path: A comparison of English, Japanese, and Turkish. Cognition 102, 16–48.
- Kita, Sotaro, Aslı Özyürek, Shanley Allen, Amanda Brown, Reyhan Furman, and Tomoko Ishizuka. 2007. Relations between syntactic encoding and co-speech gestures: Implications for a model of speech and gesture production. Language and Cognitive Processes 22, 1212–1236.
- Özyürek, Aslı, Sotaro Kita, Shanley Allen, Amanda Brown, Reyhan Furman, and Tomoko Ishizuka. 2008. Development of cross-linguistic variation in speech and gesture: Motion events in English and Turkish. Developmental psychology 40, 1040–1054.
