= System for Teaching Experimental Psychology =

Psychology teaching project

System for Teaching Experimental Psychology (STEP) is a collaborative project designed to maximize the use of E-Prime, PsyScope, and other experiment-generating systems for teaching undergraduate classes in experimental psychology. It is a database of scripts based on classic and student-created psychological experiments, tutorials, utilities, and course frameworks. The project is directed by Brian MacWhinney at Carnegie Mellon University, and other major contributors include Ping Li of the University of Richmond, Chris Schunn of the University of Pittsburgh, and James St. James of Millikin University. Support for STEP comes from the Division of Undergraduate Education of the National Science Foundation.

Students in psychology need to learn to design and analyze their own experiments. However, software that allows students to build experiments on their own has been limited in a variety of ways. E-Prime is the standard for building experiments in psychology, STEP is a Web-based resource that uses E-Prime as the delivery engine for a wide variety of instructional materials. The goal of the STEP Project is to provide instructional materials that will facilitate the use of E-Prime in various learning contexts. STEP is compiling a large set of classic experiments implemented in E-Prime and available over the Internet from http://step.psy.cmu.edu. The Web site also distributes instructional materials for building courses in experimental psychology based on E-Prime.

STEP Resources include:

The e-prime mailing list that is used to share ideas and issues regarding the use of E-Prime to build experiments.

SCRIPTS-Classic: Runnable E-Prime scripts that can be used to demonstrate classic experiments in Experimental Psychology. These are accompanied by descriptions of the original articles.

SCRIPTS-Plus: Additional E-Prime scripts for certain commonly used paradigms. These are not accompanied by descriptions of the original articles. Some of these are recent contributions.

SCRIPTS-Techniques: E-Prime scripts contributed by various users and PST designed to illustrate specific programming techniques and tasks.

SCRIPTS-Student: E-Prime scripts contributed by Brian MacWhinney's students in Cognitive Research Methods in 2002 and 2003.

MATERIALS: The E-Prime Getting Started Guide and various PowerPoint tutorials from PST, as well as additional technical documents for response boxes, etc.

UTILITIES: Utilities for working with E-Prime and PsyScope

COURSE FRAMEWORK: Complete material set for a Lab course based on E-Prime from Chris Schunn at George Mason University
