= International Association for the Study of Child Language =

Academic society

The International Association for the Study of Child Language (IASCL) is an academic society for first language acquisition researchers.

IASCL was founded in 1970 by a group of prominent language acquisition researchers to promote international and interdisciplinary cooperation in the study of child language. Its major activity is the sponsorship of the triennial International Congress for the Study of Child Language, for which it publishes proceedings. It also publishes the Child Language Bulletin approximately twice a year.

At its triennial meeting, IASCL honors a researcher who has made outstanding contributions to the international child language community with the Roger Brown Award. Previous recipients are Brian MacWhinney (2011), Dan Slobin (2014), Jean Berko Gleason (2017), Eve V. Clark (2020/2021), and Fred H. Genesee, and Elena Lieven (both 2024).

Past presidents of IASCL include Walburga von Raffler-Engel (founding president), Catherine E. Snow, Ruth A. Berman, Michael Tomasello, Gina Conti-Ramsden and Elena Lieven.

Current president is Shanley Allen (from 2024).

== Publications ==
- Journal of Child Language
- First Language
- Child Language Bulletin
- Trends in Language Acquisition Research (TiLAR)
