= Sōtarō =

- Gender: Male

Origin
- Origin: Japanese
- Meaning: Different meanings depending on the kanji used

Sōtarō, Sotaro or Soutarou (written: 聡太郎, 宗太郎, 曾太郎, 崇太郎, 創太郎, 奏太郎) or 壮太郎) is a masculine Japanese given name. Notable people with the name include:

- Sotaro (保田 聡太郎; born 1986), American actor and model
- Sotaro Fujiwara (藤原 崇太郎; born 1998), Japanese judoka
- Sotaro Kita (喜多 壮太郎; born 1963), Japanese psycholinguist
- Misu Sōtarō (三須 宗太郎; 1855–1921), Japanese admiral
- Sotaro Sada (佐田 聡太郎; born 1984), Japanese footballer
- Sōtarō Yasui (安井 曾太郎; 1888–1955), Japanese painter
- Sotaro Yasunaga (安永 聡太郎; born 1976), Japanese footballer

== See also ==
- Sōtarō Station, a railway station in Saiki, Oita Prefecture, Japan
