= Hrafnhildur =

Name list

- Pronunciation: Icelandic pronunciation: [ˈr̥apn̥ˌhɪltʏr]
- Gender: Female
- Language: Icelandic

Origin
- Origin: Old Norse: Combination of hrafn raven and hildr ('battle', 'fight')
- Meaning: Hrafn (Raven) Hildur (Battle)
- Region of origin: Iceland

Hrafnhildur is an officially approved Icelandic female given name. It is the younger version of Hrafnhildr. The name is derived from the Old Norse words for raven and battle.

== Notable people ==
=== Arts and music ===
- Hrafnhildur Hagalín, Icelandic playwright
- Hrafnhildur Arnardóttir (Shoplifter), Icelandic artists working mainly in human hair

=== Sports ===
- Hrafnhildur Lúthersdóttir, Icelandic Olympic swimmer
- Hrafnhildur Skúladóttir, Former Icelandic handball player and coach
- Hrafnhildur Hanna Þrastardóttir, Icelandic handball player
- Hrafnhildur Hauksdóttir, Icelandic football player
- Hrafnhildur Guðmundsdóttir, Icelandic Olympic swimmer
- Katrín Davíðsdóttir, Icelandic CrossFit athlete

=== Science and Technology ===
- Hrafnhildur Hanna Ragnarsdóttir, Professor Emeritus in Education and Development
