= Wilfried Ver Eecke =

Professor of philosophy

- Born: 22 August 1938 (age 88)

Academic background
- Education: UCLouvain (PhD)
- Thesis: Aron en de filosofische problemen nopens de geschiedenis (1962)

Academic work
- Era: Contemporary philosophy
- Region: Western philosophy
- School or tradition: German Idealism, Psychoanalysis
- Institutions: Georgetown University

Wilfried Ver Eecke (born 22 August 1938) is a professor of philosophy at Georgetown University.

== Life and work ==
Wilfried Ver Eecke received his PhD in philosophy from UCLouvain in 1962, with the dissertation on Raymond Aron and the Philosophical Problems Concerning History. followed by doctoral and post-doctoral work in Paris (with Paul Ricœur, Jean Hyppolite, Jacques Lacan, and Émile Benveniste), in Freiburg im Breisgau (with Niklas Luhmann) and at Harvard University (with Hilary Putnam, Stanley Cavell, Erik Erikson, Roman Jakobson, Jerome Kagan, and Roger Brown (psychologist)). Eecke joined Georgetown faculty in 1967. In 1973, he received the annual prize of the Royal Academies for Science and the Arts of Belgium for a manuscript later published in 1979 as Negativity and Subjectivity: A Study about the Function of Negation in Freud, Linguistics, Childpsychology and Hegel.

== Selected publications ==
- Eecke, Wilfried Ver (2019-05-10). Breaking through Schizophrenia: Lacan and Hegel for Talk Therapy. Bloomsbury Publishing PLC. ISBN 978-1-5381-1802-3.
- Ver Eecke, Wilfried (2008). "Ethical Dimensions of the Economy". Studies in Economics Ethics and Philosophy. doi:10.1007/978-3-540-77111-1. ISBN 978-3-540-77110-4. ISSN 1431-8822.
- Eecke, Wilfried Ver (2007). An Anthology Regarding Merit Goods: The Unfinished Ethical Revolution in Economic Theory. Purdue University Press. ISBN 978-1-55753-428-6.
- Eecke, Wilfried Ver (2006-06-01). Denial, Negation, and the Forces of the Negative: Freud, Hegel, Lacan, Spitz, and Sophocles. SUNY Press. ISBN 978-0-7914-8259-9.
- Waelhens, Alphonse de; Eecke, Wilfried Ver (2001). Phenomenology and Lacan on Schizophrenia: After the Decade of the Brain. Leuven University Press. ISBN 978-90-5867-160-8.
- Eecke, Wilfried Ver (1984). Saying "no": Its Meaning in Child Development, Psychoanalysis, Linguistics, and Hegel. Duquesne University Press. ISBN 978-0-8207-0169-1.
- Eecke, Wilfried Ver (1977). Negativity and Subjectivity: A Study about the Function of Negation in Freud, Linguistics, Childpsychology and Hegel. Paleis der Academiën.
