= Roger Brown (psychologist) =

American social psychologist (1925–1997)

- Born: Roger William Brown; April 14, 1925; Detroit, Michigan, U.S.
- Died: December 11, 1997 (aged 72); Cambridge, Massachusetts
- Occupations: Psychologist, Psycholinguist
- Known for: Social psychology, language development

Academic background
- Education: University of Michigan
- Doctoral advisor: E. Lowell Kelly

Roger William Brown (April 14, 1925 – December 11, 1997) was an American psychologist. He was known for his work in social psychology and in children's language development.

Brown taught at Harvard University from 1952 until 1957 and from 1962 until 1994, and at Massachusetts Institute of Technology (MIT) from 1957 until 1962. His scholarly books include Words and Things: An Introduction to Language (1958), Social Psychology (1965), Psycholinguistics (1970), A First Language: The Early Stages (1973), and Social Psychology: The Second Edition (1985). He authored numerous journal articles and book chapters.

He was the doctoral adviser or a post-doctoral mentor of many researchers in child language development and psycholinguistics, including Jean Berko Gleason, Susan Ervin-Tripp, Camile Hanlon, Dan Slobin, Ursula Bellugi, Courtney Cazden, Richard F. Cromer, David McNeill, Eric Lenneberg, Colin Fraser, Eleanor Rosch (Heider), Melissa Bowerman, Steven Pinker, Kenji Hakuta, Jill de Villiers, and Peter de Villiers. A Review of General Psychology survey, published in 2002, ranked Brown as the 34th-most cited psychologist of the 20th century.

== Education and career ==
Born in Detroit, Brown earned an undergraduate psychology degree in 1948 and a Ph.D. in 1952 from the University of Michigan. He started his career in 1952 as an instructor and then assistant professor of psychology at Harvard University. In 1957 he left Harvard for an associate professorship at MIT, and became a full professor of psychology there in 1960. In 1962, he returned to Harvard as a full professor, and served as chair of the Department of Social Relations from 1967 to 1970. From 1974 until his retirement in 1994, he held the title of John Lindsley Professor of Psychology in Memory of William James.

== Research and writing ==
Roger Brown's research and teaching focused on social psychology, the relationship between language and thought, and the linguistic development of children. The clarity, directness, and humor of his scholarly writing are often praised; Pinker describes him as "perhaps the best writer in psychology since James himself".

Brown's book Words and Things: An Introduction to Language (1957) examines the mutual influence of thought and language, described as "the first book on the psychology of language coming out of the cognitive revolution". His writing in this area became an inspiration for much work in the relation between language and cognition, including Eleanor Rosch (Heider)'s work on color names and color memory and Steven Pinker's 1994 book The Language Instinct.

Brown taught social psychology and published his first textbook, Social Psychology, in 1965. The book was completely rewritten and published in 1986 as Social Psychology: The Second Edition. Brown also wrote an introductory textbook on psychology, co-authored with his colleague Richard Herrnstein. Pinker noted that these two books "live in publishing infamy as a lesson of what happens to textbooks that are unconventional, sophisticated, and thought-provoking: they don't sell."

In the late 1950s, Brown and then his student Jean Berko Gleason undertook the first experimental studies on children's language development. During the late 1960s, Brown and several junior colleagues, including Ursula Bellugi, Colin Fraser, and Richard F. Cromer, undertook a landmark study of the linguistic development of children, published in A First Language: The Early Stages. This book chronicled the language development of three English-speaking children over several years, and provided an in-depth analysis of the early stages of first language acquisition. This analysis of five stages of language development, determined by structures used and by mean length of utterance (MLU), continues to be used in the field today. The original transcriptions of the three children's conversations, along with materials from many other children speaking a wide variety of languages, is available from the Child Language Data Exchange, founded by Brian MacWhinney (Carnegie Mellon University) and Catherine Snow (Harvard).

Other important works by Brown include his 1976 paper on "Flashbulb Memories", concerning people's memories of what they were doing at the time they heard about major traumatic events such as the JFK assassination. The breadth of his interests is seen in the papers reprinted in his 1970 book Psycholinguistics, which includes work with David McNeill on the 'tip of the tongue state', a study with Albert Gilman of the social factors involved in choosing familiar versus polite second-person pronouns (tu, vous) in languages like French and Spanish, and a review of the novel Lolita by Harvard colleague Vladimir Nabokov.

Brown was known for the grace with which he treated and referred to his colleagues, whether junior or senior. An example of this is found in his brief autobiography: "Jerome Bruner, then as now, had the gift of providing intellectual stimulus, but also the rarer gift of giving his colleagues the strong sense that psychological problems of great antiquity were on the verge of solution that afternoon by the group there assembled."

Early research on children's language acquisition In the late 1950s and early 1960s, Brown and his student at the time, Jean Berko Gleason, undertook the first experimental studies on children's language development. The study published by Brown and Gleason in 1960 "Word Association and the Acquisition of Grammar" attempts to answer whether children's gradual tendency to make word associations based on parts-of-speech is evidence for the maturation of the human brain to comprehend syntax of the English language. The experiment identified that children produce heterogeneous parts-of-speech answers (words thematically related) to prompted words and adults tended to produce homogenous parts of speech answers (syntactically related) to the same prompts. In order to clarify this observation, Brown also conducted a "Usage Test" in which he used nonsense words in specific grammatical contexts and asked subjects what they understood the words to mean. Younger children answered in a similar fashion to the word association test, making thematic assumptions of the nonsense words, while adults again made grammatical assumptions to word's meaning. He concludes that based on children's increasing rate of homogeneous parts-of-speech answers with age in conjunction with the answers they give to the "Usage Test" are two ways children can be observed to develop an appreciation of English syntax. Thus, supporting a theory that language acquisition is a maturational process.

Linguistic Determinism and the Part of Speech (1957) In 1957, Brown sought to figure out how language constitutes perception and thought of one's surroundings. Specifically, he took a critical look at how the meanings we assign to parts of speech (e.g., verbs naming actions and nouns naming substances) constitute differences in cognition among people. Brown focused on the semantic definition of a noun, which is known as a person, place or thing. The problem that he identified is that there is no definitive meaning of what a thing is, hence, Brown explained that nouns may be the key to understanding how parts of speech affect cognition. He hypothesized that nouns "tend to have" semantic characteristics contrary to verbs and that speakers pick up these semantic inconsistencies when learning English. To test the hypothesis, an evaluation of nouns and verbs used by children learning English and English speaking adults was completed to identify whether or not the nouns and verbs used had clear semantic differences. The examination showed that child use of nouns and verbs had clear semantic distinctions as opposed to adults. With this result, Brown also questioned if children were conscious of their distinct semantics. This question was answered through a test. An image association experiment performed on children showed that they use the part of speech of a word (whether a word is a noun, adjective, etc.) as a hint to the word's definition. In essence, children are in fact aware of semantic implications while engaging in parts of speech. Brown concluded that semantic distinctions of the parts of speech affect cognition and that different languages and their respective parts of speech may be determinants of varying cognitive operations for those who use said languages.

Frequency-Brevity Principle (1958) In his "How Shall a Thing Be Called?" article, Brown wrote about how objects have many names, but often share a common name. He proposed the frequency-brevity principle, by which he theorized that children use words that are shorter in length because shorter words are more common for objects in the English language—for example, referring to a dog as "dog" and not "animal". He elaborated on the frequency-brevity principle and how it may be violated (for example, referring to a pineapple as "pineapple" and not "fruit"). He further argued that children progress from concrete naming to more abstract categorizations as they age.

The Pronouns of Power and Solidarity (1960) In 1960, Brown and Albert Gilman conducted a questionnaire in order to gain a deeper understanding of the pronoun "you" across five languages. These five languages studied include Italian, German, Spanish, English, and French. The questionnaire presents participants with a scenario in which they must select the appropriate pronoun when speaking to others belonging to different social class, familiarities and ages. The results indicate participants shift between different pronouns in order to best compliment those they are speaking to. Brown and Gilman theorized that there are two different styles of "you," one to indicate a power dynamic, and the other to indicate a solidarity dynamic. They termed the pronoun of solidarity "T", and the pronoun of power "V" to make for clarity and understanding. The varied use of T and V is used to implicate different relationships between those in conversation based on factors such as age, social class, similarity, familiarity, respect, and expression of mood.

The Tip of The Tongue Phenomenon (1966) To test the Tip of the Tongue phenomenon empirically, Brown and David McNeill conducted a study in which they asked participants to look over a list of words and definitions and then listen to the definition one of the words on the list. Those in the "tip of the tongue" state were asked to fill out a chart assessing the related words that they are able to come up with. Brown and McNeill were able to identify two types of recall: abstract and partial, that participants exhibited when attempting to remember the target words. Abstract recall relies on the number of syllables in the target word or the location of stressed syllables in the word while partial recall relies on the number of letters the target word.

== Awards ==
Brown was a Guggenheim Fellow in 1966–67. He was elected to the American Academy of Arts and Sciences (1963) and the National Academy of Sciences (1972). In 1971 he received the Distinguished Scientific Achievement Award of the American Psychological Association, in 1973, the G. Stanley Hall Prize in Developmental Psychology of the American Association, and in 1984, the Fyssen International Prize in Cognitive Science. He also was awarded several honorary doctorates.

== Personal life ==
Roger Brown was born in Detroit, one of four brothers. His family, like many others, was hit hard by the Depression. He attended Detroit public schools, and began undergraduate studies at the University of Michigan, but World War II interrupted his education. He joined the Navy during his freshman year, and was accepted into the V-12 program, which included midshipman training at Columbia University, and served as an ensign in the U.S. Navy. During his time in the navy, he became interested in psychology. With the help of the GI BIll, he completed his university education after the war. Brown became a dedicated opera fan, with a particular admiration for Metropolitan Opera soprano Renata Scotto.

During his time at the University of Michigan, Brown met Albert Gilman (died December 22, 1989), later a Shakespeare scholar and a professor of English at Boston University. Gilman and Brown were partners for over 40 years until Gilman's death from lung cancer in 1989. Brown's sexual orientation and his relationship with Gilman were known to a few of his closest friends, and he served on the editorial board of The Journal of Homosexuality from 1985, but he did not come out publicly until 1989. Brown chronicled his personal life with Gilman and after Gilman's death in his memoir. Brown died in 1997, and is buried next to Gilman in Mount Auburn Cemetery in Cambridge, Massachusetts. His obituary in Cognition, written by his friend Steven Pinker, says that Brown's "final years were also marked by declining health. He was stricken with prostate cancer, epilepsy, arthritis, cellulitis, spinal stenosis (which made it hard for him to walk or stand up straight), and heart disease"; it also says that Brown "planned his suicide to avoid a life of further pain and physical decline."

== Selected publications ==
=== Books ===
- Brown, R (1965) Social Psychology. Collier Macmillan. ISBN 0-02-978430-1
- Brown, R (1958) Words and Things: An Introduction to Language. Glencoe, IL: The Free Press. ISBN 0-02-904810-9 (1968 ed.)
- Brown, R with others (1970) Psycholinguistics: Selected Papers. New York: Free Press. ISBN 0-02-904750-1
- Bellugi, U & Brown, R (1971) The Acquisition of Language. University of Chicago Press. ISBN 0-226-76757-4
- Brown, R (1973) A First Language: The Early Stages. Harvard University Press. ISBN 0-674-30326-1
- Brown, R & Herrnstein, RJ (1977) Psychology. Little, Brown. ISBN 0-316-11204-6
- Brown, R (1986) Social Psychology: The Second Edition. New York: Free Press ISBN 0-02-908300-1. Reprinted 2003, London: Collier Macmillan ISBN 0-7432-5340-X
- Brown, R (1996) Against my better judgment: An intimate memoir of an eminent gay psychologist. New York: Harrington Park Press. ISBN 978-0-7890-0087-3.

=== Journal articles and book chapters ===
- Brown, R & Lenneberg, E (1954) A study in language and cognition. Journal of Abnormal and Social Psychology 49:454-462.
- Brown, R & Hildum, DC (1956) Expectancy and the perception of syllables. Language 32:411-419.
- Brown, R (1957) Linguistic determinism and the part of speech. Journal of Abnormal and Social Psychology 55:1-5. Reprinted in Brown R (1970) Psycholinguistics: Selected Papers. New York: Free Press, pp. 16–27.
- Brown, R (1958) How shall a thing be called? Psychological Review 65:14-21. Reprinted in In Brown, R with others (1970) Psycholinguistics: Selected Papers. New York: Free Press, pp. 3–15.
- Brown, R & Gilman A (1960) The pronouns of power and solidarity. In T. Sebeok (ed.). Aspects of Style in Language, Cambridge MA: MIT Press. Reprinted in Brown R (1970) Psycholinguistics: Selected Papers. New York: Free Press, pp. 302–335.
- Brown, R & Berko, J (1960) Word association and the acquisition of grammar. Child Development 31: 1-14.
- Brown, R & McNeill, D (1966) The "tip of the tongue" phenomenon. Journal of Verbal Learning and Verbal Behavior 5, 325–337. Reprinted in Brown, R with others(1970) Psycholinguistics: Selected Papers.New York: Free Press, pp. 274–301.
- Brown, R, Cazden, C, & Bellugi, U (1968) Thechild's grammar from I to III. In J. P. Hill (ed), Minneapolis Symposium on Child Psychology (vol. 2) Minneapolis: University of Minnesota Press. Reprinted in Brown, R with others (1970) Psycholinguistics: Selected Papers. New York: Free Press, pp. 100–154.
- Brown, R, & Hanlon, C (1970) Derivational complexity and order of acquisition in child speech. In JR Hayes (ed.) Cognition and the Development of Language. New York: Wiley pp. 11–53.
- Brown, R (1970) The first sentences of child and chimpanzee. In Brown, R with others (1970) Psycholinguistics: Selected Papers. New York: Free Press, pp. 208–231.
- Brown, R & Kulik, J (1977) Flashbulb memories. Cognition 5:73-99.
- Brown R (1981) Music and language. In Music Educators National Conference, Report of the Ann Arbor Symposium on the Applications of Psychology to the Teaching and Learning of Music, 233–264.
- Brown R & Fish D (1983) The psychological causality implicit in language. Cognition 14:237-273.
- Fraser, C, Bellugi, U, & Brown, R (1963) Control of grammar in imitation, comprehension, and production. Journal of Verbal Learning and Verbal Behavior 2, 121–135.
