= Aslı Özyürek =

Linguist, cognitive scientist and psychologist

Aslı Özyürek is a linguist, cognitive scientist and psychologist. She is professor at the Center for Language Sciences and the Donders Institute for Brain, Cognition and Behaviour at Radboud University Nijmegen, and Director of the Multimodal Language Department of the Max Planck Institute for Psycholinguistics.

== Biography ==
Özyürek was born in Turkey, and took her BA in psychology at Boğaziçi University. She received her joint PhD in linguistics and developmental psychology from the University of Chicago in 2000, before moving to Koç University in Istanbul to take up an assistant professorship in psychology. From 2003 to 2007 she was a postdoctoral researcher at the Donders Center for Cognitive Neuroimaging in Nijmegen. In 2007 she was appointed associate professor in the Department of Linguistics at Radboud University Nijmegen, and was promoted to full professor in 2010.

In 2019, Özyürek was elected Member of the Academia Europaea. In 2022 she was appointed Director of the new Multimodal Language Department at the Max Planck Institute for Psycholinguistics, where she builds on her previous work at the Radboud University’s Multimodal Language and Cognition Lab.

== Research ==
Özyürek is a psycholinguist and neurolinguist who approaches the human capacity for language from the perspective of multimodality and nonverbal communication. She has worked extensively on gesture and on signed languages, using the methods of corpus linguistics and experimental linguistics among others.

== Selected publications ==
- Kita, Sotaro, and Aslı Özyürek. 2003. What does cross-linguistic variation in semantic coordination of speech and gesture reveal?: Evidence for an interface representation of spatial thinking and speaking. Journal of Memory and Language 48 (1), 16-32.
- Senghas, Ann, Sotaro Kita, and Aslı Özyürek. 2004. Children creating core properties of language: Evidence from an emerging sign language in Nicaragua. Science 305 (5691), 1779-1782.
- Özyürek, Aslı. Roel M. Willems, Sotaro Kita, and Peter Hagoort. 2007. On-line integration of semantic information from speech and gesture: Insights from event-related brain potentials. Journal of Cognitive Neuroscience 19 (4), 605-616.
- Willems, Roel M., Aslı Özyürek, and Peter Hagoort. 2007. When language meets action: The neural integration of gesture and speech. Cerebral Cortex 17 (10), 2322-2333.
- Goldin-Meadow, Susan, Wing Chee So, Aslı Özyürek, and Carolyn Mylander. 2008. The natural order of events: How speakers of different languages represent events nonverbally. Proceedings of the National Academy of Sciences 105 (27), 9163-9168.
- Kelly, Spencer D., Aslı Özyürek, and Eric Maris. 2010. Two sides of the same coin: Speech and gesture mutually interact to enhance comprehension. Psychological Science 21 (2), 260-267.
