= Nan Bernstein Ratner =

Specialist in child language disorders

Nan Bernstein Ratner is a professor in the Department of Hearing and Speech Sciences at the University of Maryland, College Park. Ratner is a board-recognized specialist in child language disorders.

Her primary areas of research are fluency development and disorder, psycholinguistics, and child language development. She has published numerous research articles, chapters, and edited texts, as well as co-authored textbooks in her areas of research.

== Education ==
Ratner received her Ed.D. in Applied Psycholinguistics from Boston University in 1982, her M.A. in Speech-Language Pathology/Audiology from Temple University in 1976, and her B.A. in Child Study/Linguistics from Tufts University in 1974.

== Career ==
In 1993, Ratner was appointed Professor at the University of Maryland and served as Chairman of the Department of Hearing and Speech Sciences (1993–2014). She has established major programs at UMD including the Language-Learning Early Advantage Program (LEAP) Preschool Program, Hearing Aid Dispensing Program, and the University of Maryland Autism Research Consortium (UMARC).

Ratner is a well-cited author of many research articles and book chapters, and is the co-author of A Handbook on Stuttering (6th ed) with Oliver Bloodstein and both The Development of Language (9th ed) and Psycholinguistics (2nd ed) with Jean Berko Gleason.

Additionally, Ratner serves as the editor for academic journals including American Journal of Speech Language Pathology (Fluency) and Seminars in Speech and Language (1997–2016). She is also a member of the editorial board for Evidence-based Communication Assessment and Intervention, Journal of Fluency Disorders, and Journal of Communication Disorders.

Ratner is a co-manager of FluencyBank, a TalkBank project, along with Brian MacWhinney. FluencyBank is a corpus project that aims to strengthen research in the area of fluency development across the lifespan in both typical and disordered populations.

== Awards and honors ==
She is a Fellow and Honors recipient of the American Speech, Language and Hearing Association, a fellow of the American Association for the Advancement of Science, and distinguished researcher and president-elect of the International Fluency Association. She was named Professional of the Year by the National Stuttering Association.

At the University of Maryland, Ratner founded The LEAP Preschool Program which was cited for distinction by MAHE and US Department of Education (1997). Additionally UMD named her “Undergraduate Research Mentor of the Year” in 2010.
