= Jean Berko Gleason =

American psycholinguist (born 1931)

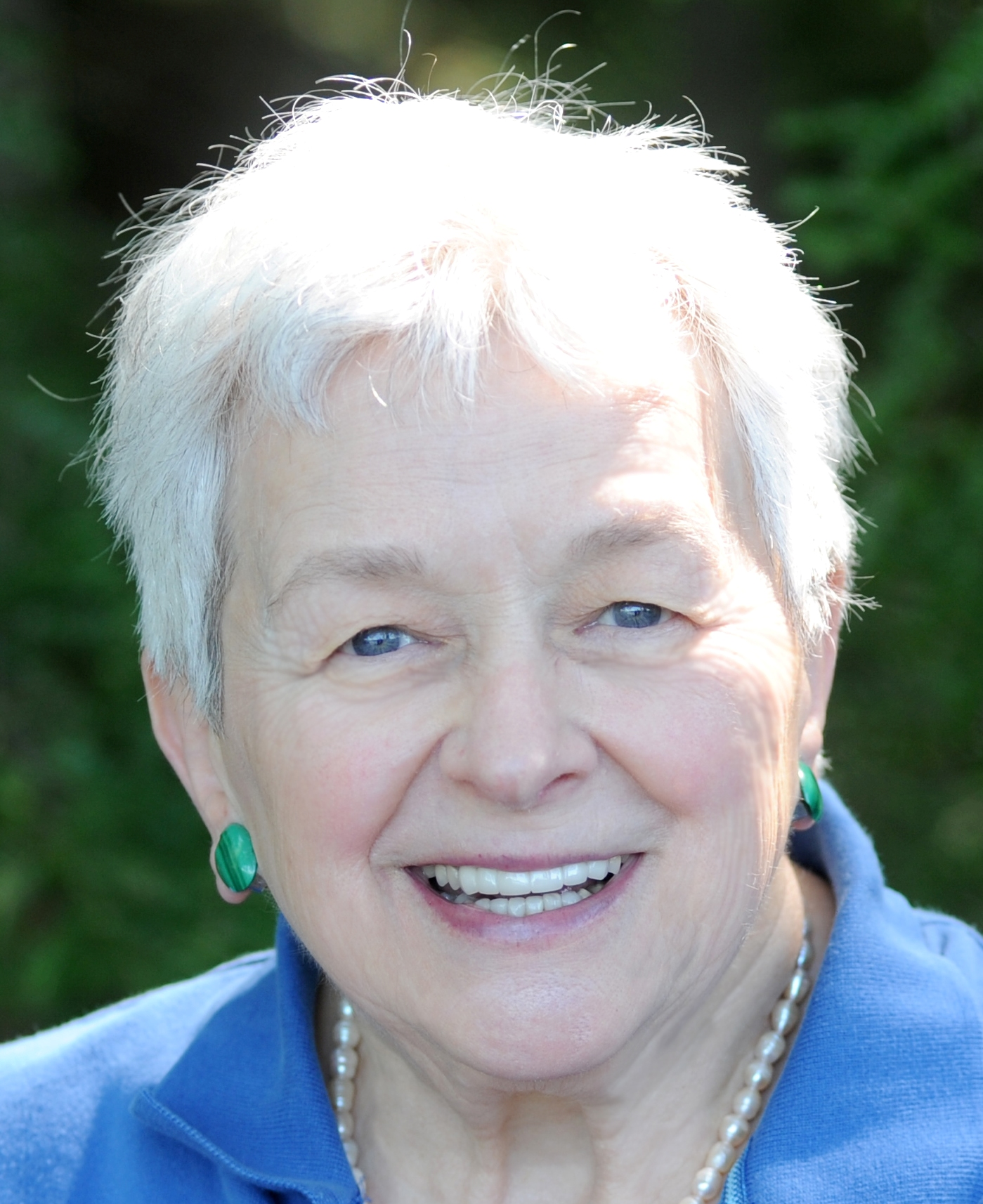
- Gleason in 2011
- Born: Jean Berko; 1931 (age 94–95); Cleveland, Ohio
- Known for: Research in language acquisition, aphasia, and language attrition Wug Test
- Spouse: Andrew M. Gleason (m. 1959; died 2008)

Academic background
- Education: Radcliffe College (A.B., A.M.); Harvard University (Ph.D.)
- Doctoral advisor: Roger Brown

Academic work
- Discipline: Linguist
- Sub-discipline: Psycholinguistics
- Institutions: Boston University
- Website: jeanberkogleason.com

Jean Berko Gleason (born 1931) is an American psycholinguist and professor emerita in the Department of Psychological and Brain Sciences at Boston University who has made fundamental contributions to the understanding of language acquisition in children, aphasia, gender differences in language development, and parent–child interactions.

Gleason created the Wug Test, in which a child is shown pictures with nonsense names and then prompted to complete statements about them, and used it to demonstrate that even young children possess implicit knowledge of linguistic morphology. Menn and Ratner have written that "Perhaps no innovation other than the invention of the tape recorder has had such an indelible effect on the field of child language research", the "wug" (one of the imaginary creatures Gleason drew in creating the Wug Test) being "so basic to what [psycholinguists] know and do that increasingly it appears in the popular literature without attribution to its origins."

== Biography ==
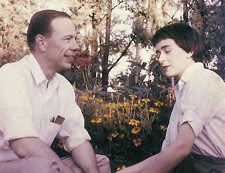
With Andrew Gleason, 1958

Jean Berko was born to Hungarian immigrant parents in Cleveland, Ohio. As a child, she has said, "I was under the impression that whatever you said meant something in some language." Her older brother's cerebral palsy made it difficult for most people to understand his speech, but

I was the person who always understood what he said. So I felt some closeness with language as well as with my brother ... I didn't start out to study psycholinguistics; I started out to study a million languages because I love them ... Norwegian, French, Russian, bits and pieces of Arabic, German, [and] enough Spanish to get dinner.

After graduating from Cleveland Heights High School in 1949, Berko Gleason (then yet Berko) earned a B.A. in history and literature from Radcliffe College, then an M.A. in linguistics, and a combined Ph.D. in linguistics and psychology, at Harvard; from 1958 to 1959 she was a postdoctoral fellow at MIT. In graduate school she was advised by Roger Brown, a founder in the field of child language acquisition. In January 1959 she married Harvard mathematician Andrew Gleason; they had three daughters.

Most of Berko Gleason's professional career has been at Boston University, where she served as Psychology Department chair and director of the Graduate Program in Applied Linguistics; Lise Menn and Harold Goodglass were among her collaborators there.

She has been a visiting scholar at Harvard University, Stanford University, and at the Linguistics Institute of the Hungarian Academy of Sciences. Although officially retired and no longer teaching, she continues to be involved in research.

Gleason is the author or co-author of some 125 papers on language development in children, language attrition, aphasia, and gender and cultural aspects of language acquisition and use; and is editor/coeditor of two widely used textbooks, The Development of Language (first edition 1985, ninth edition 2016) and Psycholinguistics (1993). She is a Fellow of the American Association for the Advancement of Science and of the American Psychological Association, and was president of the International Association for the Study of Child Language from 1990 to 1993, and of the Gypsy Lore Society 1996 to 1999. She has also served on the editorial boards of numerous academic and professional journals and was associate editor of Language from 1997 to 1999.

Gleason was profiled in Beyond the Glass Ceiling: Forty Women Whose Ideas Shape the Modern World (1996). A festschrift in her honor, Methods for Studying Language Production, was published in 2000. In 2016 she received an honorary Doctor of Science degree from Washington & Jefferson College for her work as "a pioneer in the field of psycholinguistics", and in 2017 the Roger Brown Award (recognizing "outstanding contribution to the international child language community") from the International Association for the Study of Child Language.

From 2007 to 2023, she delivered the "Welcome, welcome" and "Goodbye, goodbye" speeches at the annual Ig Nobel Awards ceremonies.

== Selected research ==
=== Children's learning of English morphology‍—‌the Wug Test ===
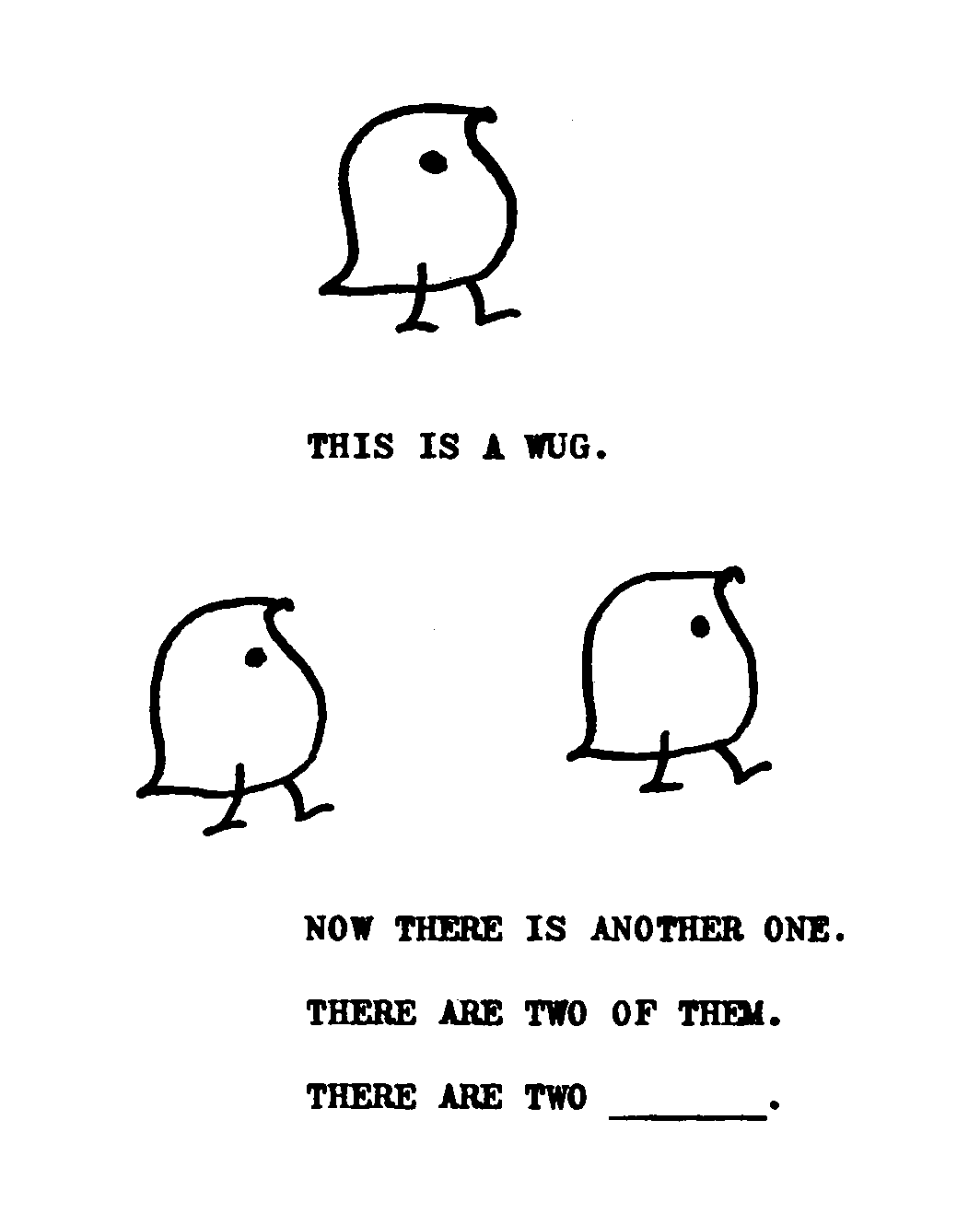
One of Gleason's hand-drawn panels from the original Wug Test (Note: The drawings used in the actual tests are colored, though the example drawing in the paper reporting the research was printed in black and white.)

Gleason devised the Wug Test as part of her earliest research (1958), which used nonsense words to gauge children's acquisition of morphological rules‍—‌for example, the "default" rule that most English plurals are formed by adding an /s/, /z/, or /ɪz/ sound depending on the final consonant, e.g. hat–hats, eye–eyes, witch–witches. A child is shown simple pictures of a fanciful creature or activity, (Note: Topics in Language Acquisition) with a nonsense name, and prompted to complete a statement about it:

This is a WUG. Now there is another one. There are two of them. There are two ________.

Each "target" word was a made-up (but plausible-sounding) pseudoword, so that the child cannot have heard it before. A child who knows that the plural of witch is witches may have heard and memorized that pair, but a child responding that the plural of wug (which the child presumably has never heard) is wugs (/wʌgz/, using the /z/ allomorph since "wug" ends in a voiced consonant) has apparently inferred (perhaps unconsciously) the basic rule for forming plurals. (Note: Very young children are baffled by the question, sometimes responding with two wug. Preschoolers ages 4 to 5 test best in dealing with /z/ after a voiced consonant, and generally say that there are two wugs, with a /z/; they do almost as well with the voiceless /s/. They do less well in dealing with /z/ in other environments such as after nasals, rhotics, and vowels. Children in the first year of primary school were almost fully competent with both /s/ and /z/. Both preschool and first-grade children dealt poorly with /ɪz/, giving the correct answer less than half the time, possibly because it occurs in the most restrictive context. Also, because the root of the test word often ended in /s/ in these cases, the children may have assumed that the word was already in its plural form. Even though the children were all able to produce the real plural "glasses" they generally responded two "tass" rather than two "tasses" when shown more than one nonsense creature called a "tass".)

The Wug Test also includes questions involving verb conjugations, possessives, and other common derivational morphemes such as the agentive -er (e.g. "A man who 'zibs' is a ________?"), and requested explanations of common compound words e.g. "Why is a birthday called a birthday?" (Note: Preschoolers tend to form compounds rather than agentives e.g. a man whose job it is to "zib" is a zibman, and often explain compound words in terms of their cultural, rather than linguistic, features e.g. a birthday is called birthday because one receives presents.) Other items included:

- This is a dog with QUIRKS on him. He is all covered in QUIRKS. What kind of a dog is he? He is a ________ dog.
- This is a man who knows how to SPOW. He is SPOWING. He did the same thing yesterday. What did he do yesterday? Yesterday he ________.

(The expected answers were QUIRKY and SPOWED.)

Gleason's major finding was that even very young children are able to connect suitable endings‍—‌to produce plurals, past tenses, possessives, and other forms‍—‌to nonsense words they have never heard before, implying that they have internalized systematic aspects of the linguistic system which no one has necessarily tried to teach them. However, she also identified an earlier stage at which children can produce such forms for real words, but not yet for nonsense words‍—‌implying that children start by memorizing singular–plural pairs they hear spoken by others, then eventually extract rules and patterns from these examples which they apply to novel words.

The Wug Test was the first experimental proof that young children have extracted generalizable rules from the language around them, rather than simply memorizing words that they have heard, and it was almost immediately adapted for children speaking languages other than English, to bilingual children, and to children (and adults) with various impairments or from a variety of cultural backgrounds. Its conclusions are viewed as essential to the understanding of when and how children reach major language milestones, and its variations and progeny remain in use worldwide for studies on language acquisition. It is "almost universal" for textbooks in psycholinguistics and language acquisition to include assignments calling for the student to carry out a practical variation of the Wug Test paradigm. The ubiquity of discussion of the wug test has led to the wug being used as a mascot of sorts for linguists and linguistics students.

The Wug Test's fundamental role in the development of psycholinguistics as a discipline has been mapped by studying references to Gleason's work in "seminal journals" in the field, many of which carried articles referencing it in their founding issues:

A review of citation lists [for Gleason's paper] over the years gives an interesting mini-view of the evolution of developmental psycholinguistics... In the first 15 years following publication, the article was extensively cited by researchers attempting to validate its utility and extend its finding to nontypical populations. Over time, however... the fact that almost any human being can do that task... became much less interesting than the question of how it is accomplished.

According to Ratner and Menn, "As an enduring concept in psycholinguistic research, the wug has become generic, like [kleenex] or [xerox], a concept so basic to what we know and do that increasingly it appears in the popular literature without attribution to its origins... Perhaps no innovation other than the invention of the tape recorder has had such an indelible effect on the field of child language research."

It has been proposed that Wug Test–like instruments be used in the diagnosis of learning disabilities, but in practice success in this direction has been limited.

=== Parent–child interactions ===
Another of Gleason's early papers "Fathers and Other Strangers: Men's Speech to Young Children" (1975) explored differences between mothers' and fathers' spoken interaction with their children, primarily using data produced by two female and two male daycare teachers at a large university, and by three mothers and three fathers, mostly during family dinners. Among other conclusions, this study found that:

- mothers used less complex constructions in speaking to their children than did fathers;
- mothers generated lengthier and more complex constructions in speaking to their eldest child than to their younger children;
- fathers issued significantly more commands than did mothers, along with more threats and more teasing in the way of name-calling; and
- the fathers' language also reflected traditional gender roles in the families (such as in an example in which a father, playing a game with his son, directs the son to the mother when the need for a diaper change arises).

In contrast, both male and female daycare teachers used language that was similar both quantitatively and qualitatively, with both focusing on a dialogue based in the present and on the immediate needs of the children. Differences included that the male teachers tended to address the children by name more often than did the female teachers and that the male teachers issued more imperatives than did the female teachers.

=== Acquisition of routines in children ===
Gleason's research eventually extended into the study of children's acquisition of routines‍—‌that is, standardized chunks of language (or language-plus-gesture) that the culture expects of everyone, such as greetings, farewells, and expressions of thanks. Gleason was one of the first to study the acquisition of politeness, examining English-speaking children's use of routines such as thank you, please, and I'm sorry. Researchers in this area have since studied both verbal and non-verbal routinization, and the development of politeness routines in a variety of cultures and languages.

==== The Halloween routine ====
Gleason's 1976 paper with Weintraub, "The Acquisition of Routines in Child Language", analyzed performance on the culturally standardized Halloween trick-or-treat routine in 115 children aged two to sixteen years. Alterations in ability and the function of parental contribution were analyzed concerning cognitive and social components. They discovered that in the acquisition of routines (in contrast to the acquisition of much of the rest of language) parents' major interest is for their children to achieve accurate performance, with little stress on children's understanding of what they are expected to say. Gleason and Weintraub found that the parents rarely if ever explain to children the meaning of such routines as Bye-bye or Trick or treat‍—‌there was no concern with the child's thoughts or intentions as long as the routine was performed as expected at the appropriate times. Thus, parents' role in the acquisition of routines is very different from their role in most of the rest of language development.

==== "Hi, Thanks, and Goodbye" ====
External videos
- Jean Berko Gleason, Hi, Thanks, and Goodbye. NOVA's Secret Life of Scientists and Engineers

Gleason and Greif analyzed children's acquisition of three ubiquitous routines in "Hi, Thanks, and Goodbye: More Routine Information" (1980). The subjects were eleven boys and eleven girls and their parents. At the conclusion of a parent-child play period, an assistant entered the playroom bearing a present, in order to evoke routines from the children. The study's purpose was to analyze how parents communicate these routines to their children; major questions proposed included whether or not some routines were more obligatory than others, and whether mothers and fathers provide different models of politeness behavior for their children. The results suggest that children's spontaneous construction of the three routines was low, with Thank you the rarest. However, parents strongly encouraged their children to generate routines and, typically, the children complied. In addition, parents were more likely to prompt the Thank you routine than the Hi and Goodbye routines. Parents practiced the routines themselves, though mothers were more likely than fathers to speak Thank you and Goodbye to the assistant.

==== Apologies ====
Gleason and Ely made an in-depth study of apologies in children's dialogue in their paper, "I'm sorry I said that: apologies in young children's discourse" (2006), which analyzed apology term usage (in parent–child dialogue) of five boys and four girls, aged one to six years. Their research suggested that apologies appear later in children than do other politeness routines, and that as the children grew older they developed a progressively refined expertise with this routine, gradually requiring fewer direct prompts and producing more elaborate apologies instead of just saying "I'm sorry". They also found that parents and other adults play an important role in fostering growth of apologetic abilities through the setting of examples, by encouraging the children to apologize, and by speaking specifically and purposefully to them about apologies.

==== Attention to language in family discourse ====
With Ely, MacGibbon, and Zaretsky, Gleason also explored the discourse of middle-class parents and their children at the dinner table in, "Attention to Language: Lessons Learned at the Dinner Table" (2001), finding that the everyday language of these parents involves a remarkable portion of attention to language. The dinner-table conversation of twenty-two middle-class families, each with a child between two years and five and one-half years old, were recorded, then analyzed for the existence and activity of language-centered terms, including words like ask, tell, say, and speak. Mothers spoke more about language than did fathers, and fathers spoke more about it than did children: roughly eleven percent of mothers' sentences contained one or more language-centered terms, and the corresponding proportions for fathers and children were seven percent and four percent. Uses that were metalinguistic (for example, accounting for and remarking on speech) exceeded uses that were pragmatic (for example, managing how and when speech appears).

The more that mothers used language-centered terms, the more the children did as well‍—‌but this was not true for fathers. The results imply that in routine family conversations, parents supply children with considerable information on the way language is used to communicate information.

=== Foreign-language studies ===
Gleason has carried out significant research involving the learning and maintenance of second languages by sequential bilinguals. She has studied the acquisition of a second language while retaining the first (additive bilingualism), examining discourse behaviors of parents who follow the one person-one language principle by using different languages with their child. She has also studied language attrition, the loss of a known language through lack of use, and suggests that the order in which a language is learned is less important in predicting its retention than the thoroughness with which it is learned.

==== Psychophysiological responses to taboo words ====
An unusual study carried out with Harris and Aycicegi, "Taboo words and reprimands elicit greater autonomic reactivity in a first language than in a second language" (2003), investigated the involuntary psychophysiological reactions of bilingual speakers to taboo words. Thirty-two Turkish-English bilinguals judged the pleasantness of an array of words and phrases in Turkish (their first language), and in English (their second), while their skin conductance was monitored via fingertip electrodes. Participants manifested greater autonomic arousal in response to taboo words and childhood reprimands in their first language than to those in their second language, confirming the commonplace claim that speakers of two languages are less uncomfortable speaking taboo words and phrases in their second language than in their native language.

==== Maintenance of first and second languages ====
In "Maintaining Foreign Language Skills", which discusses "the personal, cultural, and instructional factors involved with keeping up foreign language skills" (1988), Gleason and Pan consider both humans' remarkable capacity for language acquisition and their ability to lose it. In addition to brain damage, strokes, trauma and other physical causes of language loss, individuals may lose language skills due to the absence of a linguistically supportive social environment in which to maintain such skills, such as when a speaker of a given language relocates to a place where that language is not spoken. Culture also factors in. More often than not, individuals speaking two or more languages come into contact with one another, for reasons ranging from emigration and interrelationships to alterations in political borders. The result of such contact is typically that the community of speakers undergoes a progressive shift in usage from one language to the other.

=== Aphasia ===
Gleason has also done significant research on aphasia, a condition (usually due to brain injury) in which a person's ability to understand and/or to produce language, including their ability to find the words they need and their use of basic morphology and syntax, is impaired in a variety of ways.

In "Some Linguistic Structures in the Speech of a Broca's Aphasic" (1972) Gleason, Goodglass, Bernholtz, and Hyde discuss an experiment carried out with a man who, after a stroke, had been left with Broca's aphasia/agrammatism, a specific form of aphasia typically impairing the production of morphology and syntax more than it impairs comprehension. This experiment employed the Story Completion Test (often used to probe a subject's capacity for producing various common grammatical forms) as well as free conversation and repetition to elicit speech from the subject; this speech was then analyzed to evaluate how well he used inflectional morphology (e.g. plural and past tense word endings) and basic syntax (the formation of, for example, simple declarative, imperative, and interrogative sentences).

To do this the investigator, in a few sentences, began a simple story about a pictured situation, then asked the subject to conclude the narrative. The stories were so designed that a non–language-impaired person's response would typically employ particular structures, for example, the plural of a noun, the past tense of a verb, or a simple but complete yes-no question (e.g. "Did you take my shoes?").

Gleason, Goodglass, Bernholtz, and Hyde concluded that the transition from verb to object was easier for this subject than was the transition from subject to verb and that auxiliary verbs and verb inflections were the parts of speech most likely to be omitted by the subject. There was considerable variation among consecutive repeat trials of the same test item, although responses on successive attempts usually came closer to those a normal speaker would have produced. The study concluded that the subject's speech was not the product of a stable abnormal grammar, and could not be accounted for by assuming that he was simply omitting words to minimize his effort in producing them‍—‌questions of significant theoretical controversy at the time.

== Selected publications ==
=== Papers ===
- Berko, Jean (1958). "The Child's Learning of English Morphology". WORD. 14 (2–3): 150–177. doi:10.1080/00437956.1958.11659661. hdl:11858/00-001M-0000-002A-5DDD-2.
- Brown, Roger; Berko, Jean (1960). "Word Association and the Acquisition of Grammar". Child Development. 31 (1): 1–14. doi:10.2307/1126377. ISSN 0009-3920. JSTOR 1126377. PMID 13805002.
- Goodglass, Harold; Berko, Jean (1960). "Agrammatism and inflectional morphology in English". Journal of Speech and Hearing Research. 3 (3): 257–267. doi:10.1044/jshr.0303.257. PMID 13851047.
- Goodglass, Harold; Gleason, Jean Berko; Hyde, Mary R. (1970). "Some Dimensions of Auditory Language Comprehension in Aphasia". Journal of Speech, Language, and Hearing Research. 13 (3): 595–606. doi:10.1044/jshr.1303.595. ISSN 1092-4388. PMID 5528304. JSLHR Editor's Award
- Goodglass, Harold; Gleason, Jean Berko; Bernholtz, Nancy Ackerman; Hyde, Mary R. (1972). "Some Linguistic Structures in the Speech of a Broca's Aphasic". Cortex. 8 (2): 191–212. doi:10.1016/S0010-9452(72)80018-2. ISSN 0010-9452. PMID 5043793.
- Gleason, Jean Berko (1975). "Fathers and other strangers: Men's speech to young children". In Daniel Peter Dato (ed.). Developmental psycholinguistics: theory and applications (26th Annual Roundtable). Georgetown University Press. pp. 289–297. ISBN 978-0-87840-110-9.
- Gleason, Jean Berko; Goodglass, Harold; Green, Eugene; Ackerman, Nancy; Hyde, Mary R. (1975). "The retrieval of syntax in Broca's aphasia". Brain and Language. 2 (4): 451–471. doi:10.1016/S0093-934X(75)80083-6. ISSN 0093-934X. PMID 1218378. S2CID 569044.
- Gleason, Jean Berko; Goodglass, Harold; Obler, Loraine; Green, Eugene; Hyde, Mary R.; Weintraub, Sandra (1980). "Narrative Strategies of Aphasic and Normal-Speaking Subjects". Journal of Speech, Language, and Hearing Research. 23 (2): 370–382. doi:10.1044/jshr.2302.370. ISSN 1092-4388. PMID 7442197.
- Bellinger, David C.; Gleason, Jean Berko (1982). "Sex differences in parental directives to young children". Sex Roles. 8 (11): 1123–1139. doi:10.1007/BF00290968. ISSN 0360-0025. S2CID 144841855.
- Gleason, Jean Berko (2003). "Language Acquisition: Is it Like Learning to Walk, or Learning to Dance?". Contemporary Psychology. 48 (2): 172–174. doi:10.1037/000751. ISSN 1554-0138.
- Harris, Catherine L.; Ayçiçegi, Ayse; Gleason, Jean Berko (2003). "Taboo words and reprimands elicit greater autonomic reactivity in a first language than in a second language". Applied Psycholinguistics. 24 (4): 561–579. doi:10.1017/S0142716403000286. ISSN 0142-7164. S2CID 7219049.
- Gleason, Jean Berko; Weintraub, Sandra (2008). "The acquisition of routines in child language". Language in Society. 5 (2): 129–136. doi:10.1017/S0047404500006977. ISSN 0047-4045. S2CID 146769318.
- Greif, Esther Blank; Gleason, Jean Berko (2008). "Hi, thanks, and goodbye: More routine information". Language in Society. 9 (2): 159–166. doi:10.1017/S0047404500008034. ISSN 0047-4045. S2CID 145771682.
- Pan, Barbara Alexander; Gleason, Jean Berko (2008). "The study of language loss: Models and hypotheses for an emerging discipline". Applied Psycholinguistics. 7 (3): 193–206. doi:10.1017/S0142716400007530. ISSN 0142-7164. S2CID 145114776.

=== Book chapters ===
- Berko, Jean; Brown, Roger (1960). "Psycholinguistic research methods". In Paul H. Mussen (ed.). Handbook of research methods in child development. Wiley. pp. 517–557.
- Gleason, Jean Berko (1973). "Code switching in children's language". In Timothy E. Moore (ed.). Cognitive Development and Acquisition of Language. Academic Press. pp. 159–167. Reprinted as Timothy E. Moore, ed. (2014). Cognitive Development and Acquisition of Language. Elsevier. ISBN 978-1-4832-9456-8.
- Gleason, Jean Berko (1977). "Talking to children: Some notes on feedback". In Snow, Catherine E.; Ferguson, Charles A. (eds.). Talking to Children: Language Input and Acquisition. Cambridge University Press. pp. 199–205. ISBN 978-0-521-21318-9.
- Gleason, Jean Berko; Weintraub, Sandra (1978). "Input Language and the Acquisition of Communicative Competence". In Keith E. Nelson (ed.). Children's Language. Gardner Press. pp. 171–222. ISBN 978-0-470-99385-9.
- Gleason, Jean Berko (1987). "Sex differences in parent-child interaction". In Susan U. Philips; Susan Steele; Christine Tanz (eds.). Language, Gender, and Sex in Comparative Perspective. Cambridge University Press. pp. 189–199. ISBN 978-0-521-33807-3.
- Harris, Catherine L.; Gleason, Jean Berko; Ayçiçegi, Ayse (2006). "When is a first language more emotional? Psychophysiological evidence from bilingual speakers.". In Aneta Pavlenko (ed.). Bilingual Minds: Emotional Experience, Expression, and Representation. Multilingual Matters. pp. 257–283. ISBN 978-1-84769-981-7.
- Gleason, Jean Berko (2016). "The Development of Language: An Overview and Preview". In Gleason, Jean Berko; Ratner, Nan Bernstein (eds.). The Development of Language (9th ed.). Pearson Education. pp. 1–25. ISBN 978-0-13-416114-3.

=== Textbooks ===
- Gleason, Jean Berko, ed. (1985). The Development of Language. Charles E. Merrill. ISBN 978-0-675-20222-0. Latest edition: Gleason, Jean Berko; Ratner, Nan Bernstein, eds. (2023). The Development of Language (10th ed.). Plural Publishing. ISBN 978-1-63550-426-2.
- Gleason, Jean Berko; Ratner, Nan Bernstein, eds. (1993). Psycholinguistics. Harcourt, Brace. ISBN 978-0030559648.Latest edition: Gleason, Jean Berko; Ratner, Nan Bernstein, eds. (1998). Psycholinguistics (2nd ed.). Harcourt, Brace. ISBN 978-0155041066.
