= Pétur Gunnarsson =

Icelandic writer (born 1947)

Pétur Gunnarsson (born 15 June 1947) is an Icelandic writer.

== Early life and education ==
Pétur was born in Reykjavík. After graduating from Menntaskólinn í Reykjavík, he earned a master's degree (maîtrise) in philosophy from Aix-Marseille University in 1975.

== Career ==
His first publications were poetry: individual poems in Tímarit Máls og menningar followed by the collection Splunkunýr dagur in 1973. In 1976 he published his first novel, Punktur, punktur, komma, strik (Dot Dot Comma Dash), the first volume in a tetralogy with a shared protagonist, the Reykjavík city kid Andri Haraldsson. After publication of the German translation, the novel was named book of the year by German radio network WDR 2 in 2011. A 1980 film based on the novel was directed by Þorsteinn Jónsson; the last volume in the series, Sagan öll, was nominated for the Nordic Council Literature Prize in 1987. Three other novels have been nominated for the Icelandic Literary Prize: Hversdagshöllin (1990), Myndin af heiminum (2000) and Leiðin til Rómar (2002); the second and third of these are the first two volumes of his trilogy Skáldsaga Íslands (Novel of Iceland).

Pétur is also the author of a number of plays, including Grænjaxlar, a 1977 collaboration for the National Theatre, and Krókmakarabærinn, also 1977, a children's play for the Icelandic Academy of Drama; radio and television scripts including a 1988 documentary on Halldór Laxness; and lyrics including for the CD Lög unga fólkins, released in 1977.

He has also written a two-volume non-fiction work about the writer Þórbergur Þórðarson, of which the first was nominated for the Icelandic Literary Prize in the academic and general category in 2007 and both volumes won the 2009 Hagþenkir Award. In addition he has published translations into Icelandic of French works including Gustave Flaubert's Madame Bovary, which won the DV Culture Prize in 1996, and part of Marcel Proust's Remembrance of Things Past, and published both academic and newspaper articles on cultural issues.

He served on the board of the Alliance française from 1977 to 1981, in 1980–81 as chair. He was also on the board of the Félag áhugamanna um bókmenntir from 1988 to 1990, was chair of the Rithöfundasamband Íslands, the Icelandic Authors' Association, from 2006 to 2010, and was an editor of Tímarit Máls og menningar for many years.

== Honours ==
He received the Knight's Cross of the Order of the Falcon in January 2011.

== Personal life ==
He is married to Hrafnhildur Ragnarsdóttir; they have two sons and live in Reykjavík.

== Works ==
- 1973 Splunkunýr dagur (poetry)
- Andri Haraldsson tetralogy:
  - 1976 : Punktur, punktur, komma, strik
  - 1978 : Ég um mig frá mér til mín
  - 1982 : Persónur og leikendur
  - 1985 : Sagan öll
- 1977 : Grænjaxlar (play)
- 1977 : Krókmakarabærinn (play)
- 1987 : Sykri og brauði
- 1989 : Vasabók
- 1990 : Hversdagshöllinn
- 1991 : Dýrðin á ásýnd hlutanna
- 1994 : Efstu dagar
- 1997 : Heimkoma
- 1999 : Aldarför
- Cycle Skáldsaga Íslands:
  - 2000 : Myndin af heiminum: Skáldsaga Íslands I
  - 2002 : Leiðin til Rómar: Skáldsaga Íslands II
  - 2004 : Vélar tímans: Skáldsaga Íslands III
- 2003 : Að baki daganna (poetry)
- 2007 : ÞÞ - í fátæktarlandi: Þroskasaga Þórbergs Þórðarsonar (on the author Þórbergur Þórðarson)
- 2009 : ÞÞ - í forheimskunarlandi
- 2012 : Íslendingablokk: (tíðarandasaga)
- 2013 : Veraldarsaga (mín): aldarfarsbók
- 2014 : Veraldarsaga mín: ævisaga hugmynda
