= Nicola Botting =

British language and communication scientist

- Occupation: Professor of Developmental Disorders

Academic background
- Education: University of Hertfordshire (BSc); University of Nottingham (MA); University of Liverpool (PhD)
- Thesis: Psychological and Educational Outcome of Very Low Birthweight Children at 12yrs (1997)

Academic work
- Discipline: Communication scientist
- Institutions: City University of London

Nicola Botting is a language and communication scientist whose work focuses on language and psychological outcomes of children with low birth weight, autism spectrum disorder, developmental language disorder, and other developmental disabilities. She is Professor of Developmental Disorders, Language & Communication Science at the City University of London. Botting is editor-in-chief of the journal Autism & Developmental Language Impairments.

== Biography ==
Botting received her BSc with honors degree in Psychology at University of Hertfordshire and her MA in Clinical Child Psychology at the University of Nottingham. She continued her education at the University of Liverpool where she completed a PhD in Child Health. Her dissertation, titled Psychological and educational outcome of very low birthweight children at 12yrs was supervised by Richard Cooke and Neil Marlow. Their collaborative work documented increased risks of attention deficit hyperactivity disorder, anxiety disorder, and depression at adolescence in children born with very low birthweight (i.e., less than 1,250 grams [2.76 lb]).

Botting worked as a post-doctoral research scientist at The University of Manchester, where she collaborated with Gina Conti-Ramsden and Alison Crutchley. She later joined the faculty of the School of Education at University of Manchester. where she holds an honorary position. She was co-investigator on The Manchester Language Study, the largest UK longitudinal study of developmental language impairment. This study has followed children diagnosed with language impairment through age 23–25 years to assess long-term outcomes and psychological adjustment. At age 16–17 years, the adolescents with a history of language impairment exhibited heightened anxiety, and to a lesser extent, depressive symptoms as compared to peers with typical development.

Botting began her current position at City University of London in 2005. Her research on developmental language impairments has been funded through numerous grants from the Economic and Social Research Council (ESRC) and the Nuffield Foundation.

== Research ==
Botting's research team focuses on development of children with language impairments, autism spectrum disorder, and other developmental disorders over the lifespan, with a focus on the overlap between disorders and the presence of comorbid conditions including social difficulties. Her collaborative research has documented increased risk of sleep problems among children diagnosed with communication disorders, as well as heightened risk of attention and psychiatric disorders in children with low birth weight or a history of language impairment.

Botting and her colleagues have studied nonverbal cognitive abilities in children with language impairment using longitudinal designs. One such study documented a significant decrease in IQ scores among children with a history of language impairment between ages 7 and 14 years. Another study used a battery of nonverbal tasks to assess executive functions in deaf and hearing children and found performance on the executive function tasks to be mediated by children's language abilities.

== Representative publications ==
- Botting, N. (2002). Narrative as a tool for the assessment of linguistic and pragmatic impairments. Child Language Teaching and Therapy, 18(1), 1-21.
- Botting, N., & Conti‐Ramsden, G. (2003). Autism, primary pragmatic difficulties, and specific language impairment: Can we distinguish them using psycholinguistic markers?. Developmental Medicine & Child Neurology, 45(8), 515–524.
- Botting, N., Conti-Ramsden, G., & Crutchley, A. (1997). Concordance between teacher/therapist opinion and formal language assessment scores in children with language impairment. European Journal of Disorders of Communication, 32(3), 317–327.
- Botting, N., Powls, A., Cooke, R. W., & Marlow, N. (1997). Attention deficit hyperactivity disorders and other psychiatric outcomes in very low birthweight children at 12 years. Journal of Child Psychology and Psychiatry, 38(8), 931–941.
- Botting, N., Powls, A., Cooke, R. W., & Marlow, N. (1998). Cognitive and educational outcome of very‐low‐birthweight children in early adolescence. Developmental Medicine & Child Neurology, 40(10), 652–660.
- Conti-Ramsden, G., & Botting, N. (1999). Classification of children with specific language impairment: Longitudinal considerations. Journal of Speech, Language, and Hearing Research, 42(5), 1195–1204.
