= Jill de Villiers =

American developmental psychologist

- Occupations: Professor Emerita of Psychology and Philosophy
- Awards: Elected Member of American Academy of Arts and Sciences (2018)

Academic background
- Education: University of Reading; Harvard University

Jill G. de Villiers (born 1948) is a developmental psychologist known for her work in the field of language acquisition. She is the Sophia and Austin Smith Professor Emerita of Psychology and Philosophy at Smith College. de Villiers is a Fellow of the American Psychological Association. In 2018, she was elected as a Member of American Academy of Arts and Sciences.

de Villiers and her colleagues have developed critical tools for language assessment including the Quick Interactive Language Screener (QUILS), which is a computerized preschool language assessment, and the Diagnostic Evaluation of Language Variation (DELV), which aims to provide assessment for speakers of English dialects such as African-American English.

== Biography ==
de Villiers completed her B.S. degree in psychology from the University of Reading in 1969. She attended graduate school at Harvard University where she obtained her Ph.D. in experimental psychology at 1974 under the supervision of Roger Brown. After graduating, she taught at Harvard University for 8 years before moving to Smith College in 1971. At Smith, she received the Honored Professor award in 2003 and the Faculty Teaching award in 2002.

de Villiers work focuses on language acquisition, with a specific focus on young children's ability to use words and sentences to communicate with others. Her many contributions include studies of language acquisition in oral deaf children and relationships between language development and theory of mind. de Villiers' research has been funded by the March of Dimes, National Science Foundation, the Institute of Education Sciences, and the National Institute on Deafness and Other Communication Disorders.

== Books ==
- de Villiers, J. G., & de Villiers, P. A. (1978). Language acquisitions . Harvard University Press.
- de Villiers, J., & Roeper, T. (Eds.). (2011). Handbook of generative approaches to language acquisition. Springer Science & Business Media.

== Representative publications ==
- de Villiers, J. G. (2007). The interface of language and theory of mind. Lingua, 117 (11), 1858–1878.
- de Villiers, J. G., & de Villiers, P. A. (1973). A cross-sectional study of the acquisition of grammatical morphemes in child speech. Journal of Psycholinguistic Research, 2(3), 267–278.
- de Villiers, J. G., & de Villiers, P. A. (1973). Development of the use of word order in comprehension. Journal of Psycholinguistic Research, 2(4), 331–341.
- de Villiers, J. G., Flusberg, H. B. T., Hakuta, K., & Cohen, M. (1979). Children's comprehension of relative clauses. Journal of Psycholinguistic Research, 8(5), 499–518.
- de Villiers, J. G., & Pyers, J. E. (2002). Complements to cognition: A longitudinal study of the relationship between complex syntax and false-belief-understanding. Cognitive Development, 17 (1), 1037–1060.
