= TalkBank =

TalkBank is a multilingual corpus established in 2002 and currently directed and maintained by Brian MacWhinney. The goal of TalkBank is to foster basic and applied research on human communication. This online repository contains multiple databases spanning different subfields of communication, including first language acquisition, phonological development, second language acquisition, multiingualism, conversation analysis, and classroom discourse. It includes transcripts and available media (e.g., audio or video) of human communicative interactions and day-long recordings of children's home language environments. The repository also contains language corpora from individuals affected by various clinical conditions, including stuttering, dementia, traumatic brain injury, and aphasia. It uses these databases to advance the development of standards and tools for creating, sharing, searching, and commenting upon primary linguistic materials.

TalkBank contains CHILDES (Child Language Data Exchange System), an online repository of language acquisition data created by MacWhinney and Catherine Snow in 1984. TalkBank also hosts the CLAN (Computerized Language ANalysis) software used to transcribe, handle and play media, in the CHAT format.

Language Development Research, a diamond open-access, open-science publication, is the official journal of the TalkBank system.

== See also ==
- Transana, QDA Coding Program, originally funded development by the TalkBank
