= Competition model =

Theory of language acquisition

The competition model is a psycholinguistic theory of language acquisition and sentence processing, developed by Elizabeth Bates and Brian MacWhinney (1982). The claim in MacWhinney, Bates, and Kliegl (1984) is that "the forms of natural languages are created, governed, constrained, acquired, and used in the service of communicative functions." Furthermore, the model holds that processing is based on an online competition between these communicative functions or motives. The model focuses on competition during sentence processing, crosslinguistic competition in bilingualism, and the role of competition in language acquisition. It is an emergentist theory of language acquisition and processing, serving as an alternative to strict innatist and empiricist theories. According to the Competition Model, patterns in language arise from Darwinian competition and selection on a variety of time/process scales including phylogenetic, ontogenetic, social diffusion, and synchronic scales.

== The classic competition model ==
The classic version of the model focused on competition during sentence processing, crosslinguistic competition in bilingualism, and the role of competition in language acquisition.

=== Sentence processing ===
The competition model was initially proposed as a theory of cross-linguistic sentence processing. The model suggests that people interpret the meaning of a sentence by taking into account various linguistic cues contained in the sentence context, such as word order, morphology, and semantic characteristics (e.g., animacy), to compute a probabilistic value for each interpretation, eventually choosing the interpretation with the highest likelihood. According to the model, cue weights are learned inductively on the basis of the extent to which the cues are available and reliable guides to meanings in comprehension and to forms in production.

Because different languages use different cues to signal meanings, the competition model maintains that cue weights will differ between languages, and users of a given language will use the cue weights associated with that language, to guide their interpretation of sentences. Thus, when people learn other languages, they must learn which cues are important in which languages, in order to successfully interpret sentences in any language. The model defines a cue as an information source present in the surface structure of utterances that allows the language user to link linguistic form with meaning or function. Cues vary in their type (morphological, syntactic, prosodic, semantic, and pragmatic), availability (how often they are present), and reliability (how often they lead to the correct interpretation). Each cue has a certain level of cue validity, the joint product of availability and reliability. Cues of the same basic type, such as case-marking, animacy, or word order may have markedly different levels of validity in different languages. For example, the cue of animacy plays a minimal role in English, but a major role in Italian.

The model holds that cues both compete and cooperate during processing. Sometimes cues cooperate or converge by pointing to the same interpretation or production. Sometimes, cues compete by pointing to conflicting interpretations or productions.

=== Language acquisition ===
The application of the model to child language acquisition focuses on the role that cue availability and reliability play in determining the order of acquisition of grammatical structures. The basic finding is that children first learn the most available cue(s) in their language. If the most available cue is not also the most reliable, then children slowly shift from depending on the available cue to depending on the more reliable cue.

=== Methods ===
The competition model implies that language emergence on the developmental or ontogenetic timescale can be examined in at least two ways. One methodology uses neural network models to simulate the acquisition of detailed grammatical structures. Competition model researchers have constructed connectionist models for the acquisition of morphology, syntax, and lexicon in several languages, including English, German, and Hungarian. In addition, the ontogenetic emergence of language has been examined from a biological viewpoint, using data on language processing from children with early focal lesions. The results of studies of these children using reaction time methodologies and neuropsychological tests indicate that, although they have completely normal functional use of language, detailed aspects of processing are slower in some cases. Using functional magnetic resonance imaging technology, areas of neurological activation involved in specific linguistic tasks have been pinpointed in these children. These results have allowed researchers to evaluate a series of hypotheses regarding sensitive periods for the emergence of language in the brain.

== The unified competition model ==
The classic competition model accounts well for many of the basic features of sentence processing and cue learning. It relies on a small set of assumptions regarding cues, validity, reliability, competition, transfer, and strength—each of which could be investigated directly. However, the model is limited in several important ways.

- Brain structure: The classic model makes no contact with what we now know about the organization of language in the brain. As a result, it provides only incomplete understanding of patterns of language disorder and loss.
- Critical period: The classic model fails to come to grips with the idea that there is a biologically-determined critical period for language acquisition.
- Motivation: The classic model provides no role for social and motivational factors governing language learning, preference, code-switching, and attrition.
- Mental models: The classic model fails to include a role for mental model construction during comprehension and formulation during production.
- Microgenesis: The classic model does not provide a microgenetic account for the course of item acquisition, fluency development, and cue strength learning.

Extending the classic model to deal with these challenges involves borrowing insights from related theories. The resultant broader theory is called the Unified Competition Model or UCM, because it seeks to unify a variety of independent theoretical frameworks into a single overall model. The transition from the classic version of the model to the unified version worked to bring the model into fuller accord with the theory of emergentism, as developed in the biological (West-Eberhard, 2003), social (Kontopoulos, 1993) and physical sciences (von Bertalanffy, 1968).

=== Unifying the L1 and L2 learning models ===
A major challenge facing an emergentist, functionalist, non-nativist model such as the UCM involves dealing with age-related changes in the outcome of second language (L2) acquisition. It is widely accepted that children end up acquiring a second language more completely than adults. One account proposes that this "fundamental difference" (Bley-Vroman, 2009) between child and adult L2 learning arises from the expiration of a biologically-based critical period for natural language learning. In contrast, the framework of the Competition Model emphasizes that all forms of language acquisition make use of the same set of cognitive and social processes, although they differ in the relative reliance on specific processes and the extent to which these processes interact with other learning.

Specifically, the UCM holds that adults are more challenged than children by a set of four risk factors that can impede L2 acquisition.

1. The entrenchment of first language (L1) patterns (Schmid, 2017) leads to competition with L2 patterns. The role of entrenchment and competition as shaping adult L2 performance was already a major features of the classic Competition Model (Bates & MacWhinney, 1981; McDonald, 1989). It is important to consider that entrenchment is fundamental property of neural network functioning (Zevin, 2012), rather than a species-specific genetic mechanism of the type involved in critical periods.
2. Adults rely heavily on transfer of patterns from L1 to L2. This leads to quick initial learning which then fails to accurately acquire L2 patterns. In addition to these negative effects of transfer, adult reliance on translation from L1 creates a parasitic relation of L2 on L1 (Kroll, Van Hell, Tokowicz, & Green, 2010).
3. When acquiring new words, adults tend to apply overanalysis by isolating content words in phrases without regard to inflections and function words. Children, on the other hand, are more likely to learn language by acquiring words as parts of larger chunks.
4. Adults may be subject to isolation from interactions with the L2 community.

Adults can counterbalance these four risk factors through an emphasis on four protective or preventive factors.

1. Adults can learn and consolidate new forms through an emphasis on resonance – the process of creating meaningful links between L2 forms (Schlichting & Preston, 2015).
2. Adults can bring themselves to think in L2 (Vygotsky, 1934). This process of internalization leads to further strengthening of links between L2 patterns, producing greater fluency.
3. When learning new forms and combinations, adults can emphasize chunking of large phrasal units.
4. Adults can avoid social isolation and maximize participation by reading L2 materials, watching L2 programs, and socializing with L2 groups (Firth & Wagner, 2007).

All of these processes can impact both children and adults. What differs across age is the relative social status of the person and the degree to which they have already consolidated L1.

=== Three components of emergentism ===
The account given above for the effects of age on L2 learning emphasizes the role of competition as formulated in the classic version of the model. However, we know that there are variations in the learning of different types of linguistic structures. For example, although adults outperform children in terms of learning of the L2 lexicon, they encounter significantly more problems in acquiring a nativelike L2 pronunciation. To understand these differences, we need to think about language in terms of its component structural levels. Emergentist theory emphasizes three major dimensions that control physical, biological, and social processes. These are competition, structural levels, and time/process frames. The classic version of the Competition Model describes and quantifies the role of competition in language. However, in a fuller emergentist account, this analysis of competition must be supplemented through an analysis of structural levels and time/process scales.

=== Structural analysis ===
Structural linguistic analysis (Harris, 1951) distinguishes the levels of input phonology, output phonology, lexicon, semantics, morphology, syntax, mental models, and interaction. Processing on these levels can be analyzed in terms of the related theories of statistical learning (input phonology), gating and fluency (output phonology), embodied cognition and hub-and-spoke theory (semantics), DevLex (lexicon), item-based patterns (syntax), perspective theory (mental models), and CA theory (interaction). The theories for lexicon, syntax, and mental models have been elaborated in specific ways that help unify the approach. These elaborations include specifically the theory of item-based patterns and the theory of perspective shifting.

==== Item-based patterns ====
The theory of item-based patterns is based on ideas about positional patterns from Braine (1962, 1976) that were modified by MacWhinney to restrict early patterns to individual lexical items. The theory holds that children learn item-based patterns to combine words by focusing on individual operators, such as "my" or "more". They learn these patterns as a part of their learning about the function of these operator words. They then generalize groups of item-based patterns to abstract feature-based patterns such as the one that places adjectives before nouns in English. In this way, the theory of item-based patterns can be viewed as an early instantiation of Construction Grammar, albeit one specifically designed to account for child language learning. Sentence processing involves the repeated filling (or merge or unification) of roles specified by the item-based and feature-based patterns.

==== Mental models and perspective ====
The linked dependency structure provide by the operation of item-based and feature-based patterns serves as the input to mental model construction. On this level, sentences encode agency, causation, reference, and space-time through a process of perspective taking. This process allows the human mind to construct an ongoing cognitive simulation of the meaning of an utterance coded in linguistic abstractions, through the use of perceptual realities derived from one's embodied experience. The perspective taking approach views the forms of grammar as emerging from repeated acts of perspective taking and perspective switching during online language comprehension. Grammatical devices such as pronouns, case, voice, and attachment can all be seen as ways of expressing shifts in a basically ego-centered perspective. As noted by Chafe (1994) and MacWhinney (1977, 2008), perspective-taking and perspective-shifting play a central role in linking together models of the actions of agents, referents, positions in space-time, and causation (Talmy, 2000). Articulation of the links between the theory of perspective and the classic Competition Model depends on examination of online cue processing effects, as illustrated in studies such as McDonald and MacWhinney (1995) which examined how verb-based implicit causality established mental models that influence anaphoric binding. One major goal in this line of research is to better understand the brain mechanisms underlying perspective shifting during language comprehension.

==== Complexity ====
Complexity arises from the hierarchical recombination of small parts into larger structures (Simon 1962). For language, the smallest parts are the articulatory commands of output phonology, the auditory features of input phonology, and the perceptual features underlying semantics. These articulatory, auditory, and perceptual patterns combine into words that combine into phrases that combine into mental models that compose interactions and narratives. Within each of these major structural levels, we can distinguish additional substructures. Within phonology, words are structured into tone groups composed of syllables that are composed of onsets, nuclei, and codas, which control clusters of articulatory gestures. Within the lexicon, morphemes can be combined into compounds, phrases, inflected forms, and derivations. Syntactic patterns can be coded at the most elementary level in terms of item-based patterns, which are then grouped on the next level of abstraction into constructions, and eventually general syntactic patterns. Mental models are based on an interlocking system emerging from the levels of role assignment, space-time configuration, causal relations, and perspective taking.

The levels distinguished by structural analysis are richly interconnected. This means that, although they are partially decomposable (Simon, 1962), they are not modular in the sense of Fodor (1983), but rather interactive in the sense of Rumelhart and McClelland (1987). In order to achieve gating and activation, processing levels must be interconnected in a way that permits smooth coordination. The UCM assumes that these interconnections rely on methods for topological, i.e. tonotopic (Wessinger, Buonocore, Kussmaul, & Mangun, 1997) or somatotopic (Hauk, Johnsrude, & Pulvermuller, 2004), organization that are used throughout the cortex.

Structural analysis has many important consequences for our understanding of relations between first and second language learning. Age-related first language entrenchment operates in very different ways in different cortical areas (Werker & Hensch, 2014). In second language production, contrasts and timing relations between the levels of conceptualization, formulation, and articulation (Levelt, 1989) produce marked effects on language performance (Skehan, 2009), although similar effects can be found also in first language acquisition (Snow, 1999). The details of this analysis can be found in MacWhinney (2017).

=== Time/process scales ===
The third component of emergentist analysis (after competition and structural levels) is the theory of time/process scales. Emergentist theory holds that structures emerge from the constraints arising within time/process frames. The operation of time/process frames and their constraints can be illustrated by looking at how a set of four structural levels determine the shape of proteins (Campbell, Reece, & Mitchell, 1999). During protein folding, the primary structure of the protein is constrained by the sequence of amino acids in the chain of RNA used by the ribosome as the template for protein synthesis. This sequence conveys a code shaped by evolution; but the physical shape of a specific protein is determined by processes operating after initial RNA transcription. The first partially folded structure to emerge is the secondary structure of coils and folds created by the imposition of constraints from hydrogen bonding across the amino acid chain. These forces can only impact the geometry of the protein once the primary structure emerges from the ribosome and begins to contract. After these second structures have formed, a tertiary structure arises from constraints imposed by hydrophobic reactions and disulfide bridges across the folds and coils of the secondary structures. Finally, the quaternary structure derives from the aggregation of polypeptide subunits based on the ternary structures. It is this final structure that allows each protein to serve its unique role, be it oxygen transport for hemoglobin or antigen detection for antibodies. In this partially decomposable emergent system, each level involves a configuration of components from lower levels, but the biochemical constraints operative on each level are unique to that level and only operate once that level has emerged during the process of folding.

The fully emergentist version of the UCM emphasizes the ways in which language learning and processing is constrained by processes operating at divergent structural levels in divergent time/process frames (MacWhinney, 2015a). To account for patterns of disfluency, stuttering, code-switching, and conversational sequencing, we look at the constraints imposed by online lexical access, patterns of cortical activation, and social affiliation. Some of these constraints operate across a timeframe of milliseconds and others, like social affiliation, extend across decades. The UCM distinguishes five major groups of time/process frames: phylogenetic drift in the species, diachronic change through social diffusion in the language, developmental change across the lifespan, memory consolidation across days, and frames for online processing and conversation in the moment. Within each of these five major time/process frame groups there are dozens of component processes working to constrain the shape of language.

The importance of timeframes is illustrated by a particularly puzzling aspect of language learning, which is the way in which young immigrant children can completely forget their first language (Ventureyra, Pallier, & Yoo, 2004). These cases of complete language attrition contrasts with the minimal level of language attrition experienced by older immigrants (MacWhinney, 2018). It is difficult to account for this in terms of entrenchment alone, because the young learners have used their L1 continually for as much as 6 years. Instead one needs to look at the role of social support for young immigrants, pressures to adopt L2, and the role of literacy in helping older learners consolidate their access to L1 forms. Understanding the interactions of these processes requires a model that can bring all of these forces and timeframes together in terms of competition, motivation, and consolidation. Elaborating these effects is now a major emphasis for ongoing UCM research.

== Further development of the competition model ==
The classic version of the competition model emphasized the ways in which cue reliability shaped cue strength. These effects were measured in highly structured sentence processing experiments. To address certain limitations of this research, the Unified Competition Model sought to account in greater detail for age-related facts in the comparison between child and adult second language learning. Within the classic model, the only mechanism that could account for these effects was competition between L1 and L2 patterns, as expressed through negative transfer. Although transfer plays a major role as a risk factor for difficulties in adult L2 learning, it is not the only risk factor.

Looking more closely at the variety of L2 learning outcomes across structural levels and timeframes, it became evident that we needed to construct a more complex account for variable outcomes in L2 learning. This account required a deeper integration of emergentist theory into the UCM framework. The resultant account is now able to address each of the limitations of the classic model mentioned earlier. Specifically,

· by linking linguistic structures to particular brain regions, the model is increasingly grounded neurolinguistically (MacWhinney, 2019),

· by delineating a set of risk and protective factors, the model deals more accurately with age-related patterns in L2 learning,

· by providing a time/process frames account of social and motivational factors, the model accounts better for variation in L2 outcome by social groups, work environments, as well as providing accounts for patterns of code-switching and language attrition,

· by linking in the theory of perspective-switching, we have a fuller understanding of online sentence processing, and

· by developing corpus (MacWhinney, 2019) and online experimental (eCALL) methods (MacWhinney, 2017), the model now provides a fuller microgenetic account of the growth of fluency .

By addressing each of these issues within the context of analyses of L2 learning, the current version of the UCM allows us to better understand not only L2 learning, but also language evolution (MacWhinney, 2005), language change, child language development (MacWhinney, 2015), language disorders (Presson & MacWhinney, 2011), and language attrition (MacWhinney, 2018).

== See also ==
- Language acquisition
- Language development
- Elizabeth Bates
- Brian MacWhinney
- Situated cognition
- Emergentism
