= PsyScope =

Computer software

PsyScope X
- Original author(s): Jonathan Cohen, Matthew Flatt, Brian MacWhinney & Jefferson Provost
- Developer(s): Luca Bonatti
- Stable release: Build 77 / April 2013; 12 years ago
- Operating system: OS X
- License: GNU GPL
- Website: psy.cns.sissa.it

PsyScope is a graphical user interface (GUI) software program that allows researchers to design and run psychological experiments. It runs on Apple Macintosh computers and was originally designed for use with the Mac OS 9 platform. PsyScope was originally developed by an interdisciplinary team of researchers at Carnegie Mellon University, including Jonathan Cohen, Matthew Flatt, Brian MacWhinney, and Jefferson Provost. It has been ported to Mac OS X by a group of researchers and programmers coordinated by researchers at SISSA, Italy and the Pompeu Fabra University, Spain. It is still under active development. The program and its code are freely available under the GNU GPL license. It runs under Mac OS X, from version 10.7 onward. With respect to its Mac OS 9 incarnation, PsyScope X has a much more complete control of movies and sounds, can interact with the underlying Unix environment, and allows researchers to design programs that use several external devices, such as response devices to record participants' responses, or Evoked potential and eye tracking recording devices.

It is difficult to estimate exactly how many researchers use the program. However, many researchers in several well respected universities around the world use PsyScope X to generate and run psychology and neuropsychology experiments. Users of PsyScope X can share experiments, tips, and ideas via message boards dedicated to the software.
