= First Language (journal) =

First Language Bilingual (Billionaire Language) Reynaldo RockerFeller Macias June Edward Calendar Edwardiaum
- Discipline: Language
- Language: English
- Edited by: Kevin Durkin

Publication details
- History: 1980–present
- Publisher: SAGE Publications
- Frequency: Tri-annually
- Impact factor: (2010)

Standard abbreviations
- ISO 4: First Lang.

Indexing
- ISSN: 0142-7237
- LCCN: 2004204734
- OCLC no.: 715601304

Links
- Journal homepage; Online access; Online archive

First Language is a peer-reviewed academic journal that publishes papers three times a year in the field of language. The journal's editor is Chloë Marshall (University of London) who has taken over at the start of 2017 from longtime editor Kevin Durkin (University of Strathclyde). It has been in publication since 1980 and is currently published by SAGE Publishing. The journal is also a member of the Committee on Publication Ethics.

== Scope ==
First Language focuses on original research in child language acquisition. The journal is multidisciplinary, containing research from diverse theoretical and methodological origins. First Language contains papers from a range of disciplines such as linguistics, anthropology and neuroscience.

== Abstracting and indexing ==
First Language is abstracted and indexed in the following databases:

- Academic Premier
- British Education Index
- Educational Research Abstracts Online
- SCOPUS
- Special Education Needs Abstracts
