= Brian MacWhinney =

American psychologist and linguist

- Born: August 22, 1945 (age 81); New York, New York, United States
- Education: University of California, Berkeley
- Known for: Competition model CHILDES database Connectionist modeling
- Scientific career
- Fields: Language acquisition Psychology; Linguistics
- Workplaces: Carnegie Mellon University; University of Denver
- Doctoral advisor: Susan Ervin-Tripp; Dan Slobin

Brian James MacWhinney (born August 22, 1945) is a Professor of Psychology and Modern Languages at Carnegie Mellon University. He specializes in first and second language acquisition, psycholinguistics, and the neurological bases of language, and he has written and edited several books and over 100 peer-reviewed articles and book chapters on these subjects. MacWhinney is best known for his competition model of language acquisition and for creating the CHILDES (Child Language Data Exchange System) and TalkBank corpora.

MacWhinney has also helped to develop a stream of pioneering software programs for creating and running psychological experiments, including PsyScope, an experimental control system for the Macintosh; E-Prime, an experimental control system for the Microsoft Windows platform; and System for Teaching Experimental Psychology (STEP), a database of scripts for facilitating and improving psychological and linguistic research.

== Biography ==
MacWhinney earned a B.A. in rhetoric and geology from the University of California, Berkeley in 1965, at the age of 19. He subsequently received an M.A. in speech science (1967) and a Ph.D. in psycholinguistics (1974), both also from UC Berkeley. Prior to pursuing a full-time career as a scholar, MacWhinney worked as an elementary school teacher in the Oakland Unified School District from 1966–1968, a teaching associate at UC Berkeley from 1968–1973, a research associate at UC Berkeley from 1972–1973, and a research psychologist at UC Davis from 1973-1974. MacWhinney was hired for his first full-time academic position in 1974 as a tenure-track professor of psychology at the University of Denver. In 1981, he was invited to join the faculty of the Department of Psychology at Carnegie Mellon University, where he has remained since. In 2001, MacWhinney served as a Visiting Distinguished Professor at Hong Kong University.

Many organizations and academic institutions, including the International Association for the Study of Child Language, National Research Council, and Brain Map Advisory Board, have honored MacWhinney for the quality of his research and scholarship. MacWhinney's professional service activities include active participation on the governing boards of several professional associations, academic journals, and grant agencies, and he has also served as a university program reviewer and as an ad hoc reviewer for several prestigious journals including Science, Nature, and Psychological Bulletin and Review. He holds membership and fellowship in many prominent professional societies, including the American Educational Research Association, American Psychological Society, Association for Computational Linguistics, Cognitive Science Society, International Association for Child Language, Linguistic Society of America, Psychonomic Society, and Society for Research in Child Development.

MacWhinney is married and has two sons. He is fluent in six languages, including English, Hungarian, German, French, Spanish, and Italian, and has presented his research in many countries around the world.

== Competition model ==
MacWhinney has developed a model of first and second language acquisition as well as language processing called the competition model. This model views language acquisition as an emergentist phenomenon that results from competition between lexical items, phonological forms, and syntactic patterns, accounting for language processing on the synchronic, ontogenetic, and phylogenetic time scales. Empirical studies based on the competition model have shown that learning of language forms is based on the accurate recording of many exposures to words and patterns in different contexts. The predictions of the competition model have been supported by research in the realms of psycholinguistics, cognitive neuroscience, and cognitive development.

== CHILDES & TalkBank Projects ==
MacWhinney developed and directs the CHILDES and TalkBank corpora, two widely used databases for language acquisition research. He manages FluencyBank, a TalkBank project, together with Nan Bernstein Ratner.

The CHILDES system provides tools for studying conversational interactions. These tools include a database of transcripts, programs for computer analysis of transcripts, methods for linguistic coding, and systems for linking transcripts to digitized audio and video. The CHILDES database includes a rich variety of computerized transcripts from language learners. Most of these transcripts record spontaneous conversational interactions. There are also transcripts from bilingual children, older school-aged children, adult second-language learners, children with various types of language disabilities, and aphasics who are trying to recover from language loss. The transcripts include data on the learning of 26 different languages.

TalkBank contains CHILDES as well as additional linguistic data from older children and adults, including people with aphasia, second language learners, adult conversation, and classroom language learning data. In 2020, Ben Ambridge and MacWhinney co-founded Language Development Research as the official journal of the TalkBank system.

Support for the construction and maintenance of the databases comes from the National Institute of Child Health and Human Development (NIH-NICHD) and the National Science Foundation Linguistics Program.

== Linguistic Functionalism ==
Recently, MacWhinney's work has focused on aspects of second language learning and the neural bases of language as revealed by the development of children with focal brain lesions. He has begun to explore a new form of linguistic functionalism, which relates the communicative functions postulated by the competition model to the process of perspective-taking. This process allows the human mind to construct an ongoing cognitive simulation based on linguistic abstractions grounded on perceptual realities. The perspective-taking approach views the forms of grammar as emerging from repeated acts of perspective-taking and perspective-switching. Grammatical devices such as pronouns, case, voice, and attachment can all be seen as ways of expressing shifts in a basically ego-centered perspective. One major goal in this new line of research is to better understand the brain mechanisms underlying perspective-shifting.

== Honors and awards ==
- President, International Association for the Study of Child Language, 1999–2002
- National Research Council panel on Early Childhood Education, 1998–1999
- International Association for Child Language Executive Committee, 1990–1996
- Brain Map Advisory Board, 1992–1995
- Fellow, Association for Psychological Science
- Fellow, American Psychological Association
- Advisory Board of the MacArthur Infancy Network, 1988–1990
- Chair, Oversight Committee for the Behavioral Sciences, 1987
- Nominated as Fellow, Center for Advanced Research, 1987
- Director, Child Language Data Exchange System, 1984–present
- Nominated for NATO fellowship, 1980
- Nominated for Fulbright lectureship, 1979
- Ford Fellow, 1973
- IREX Fellow, 1973

== See also ==
- Competition model
- CHILDES
- TalkBank
- PsyScope
- System for Teaching Experimental Psychology
- International Association for the Study of Child Language
