= Sotaro Kita =

Japanese psycholinguist (born 1963)

- Born: 1963 (age 62–63)
- Education: B.Eng., Mathematical engineering and M.Eng. Information engineering, University of Tokyo; Ph.D in psychology and linguistics, University of Chicago, United States
- Alma mater: University of Chicago, USA
- Occupation: Psychologist
- Writing career
- Language: English, Japanese
- Period: 1993
- Genre: Psychology
- Subjects: Scientific research into psycholinguistics; language, thought and gesture

Sotaro Kita (喜多 壮太郎, Kita Sōtarō; born 1963) is a Japanese psycholinguist. He is a professor in the Department of Psychology at The University of Warwick. His work focuses on the psycholinguistic properties of gestures accompanying speech, relations between spatial language and cognition, language development, and sound symbolism.

== Education and career ==
Kita received his PhD from the University of Chicago in 1993, working in the lab of David McNeill. His dissertation focused on spontaneous gestures and Japanese mimetics. From 1993 to 2003, Kita led the Gesture Project at Max Planck Institute for Psycholinguistics, one of the research foci of the MPI.

From 2017 to 2023, Kita has served as the editor of GESTURE (published by John Benjamins). Kita was president of the International Society for Gesture Studies from 2012 to 2014, and vice-president from 2010 to 2012.

Kita's research has been funded by the National Science Foundation, the Leverhulme Trust, and other agencies.

== Appointments ==
- 1993-2003 Led the Gesture Project at Max Planck Institute for Psycholinguistics
- 1993-1994 Postdoctoral Researcher at Max Planck Institute for Psycholinguistics
- 1994-2003 Senior Researcher at Max Planck Institute for Psycholinguistics
- 2003-2006 Senior Lecturer at the Dept. of Experimental Psychology in the University of Bristol
- 2006-2013 Reader at the School of Psychology in the University of Birmingham
- 2013–present Professor of Psychology of Language at University of Warwick

== Books ==
- Kita, S. (2002). Jesuchaa: kangaeru karada [Gesture: the body that thinks]. Kaneko Shobo.
- Kita, S. (Ed.) (2003). Pointing: Where language, culture, and cognition meet. Psychology Press

== Selected publications ==
- Chu, Mingyuan; Kita, Sotaro (2011). "The nature of gestures' beneficial role in spatial problem solving". Journal of Experimental Psychology: General. 140 (1): 102–116. doi:10.1037/a0021790. hdl:11858/00-001M-0000-000F-83DC-4. PMID 21299319.
- Imai, Mutsumi; Kita, Sotaro; Nagumo, Miho; Okada, Hiroyuki (October 2008). "Sound symbolism facilitates early verb learning". Cognition. 109 (1): 54–65. doi:10.1016/j.cognition.2008.07.015. PMID 18835600. S2CID 12490557.
- Kita, Sotaro (1997). "Two-dimensional semantic analysis of Japanese mimetics" (PDF). Ling. 35 (2): 379–416. doi:10.1515/ling.1997.35.2.379. S2CID 144380452.
- Kita, Sotaro; Özyürek, Asli (January 2003). "What does cross-linguistic variation in semantic coordination of speech and gesture reveal?: Evidence for an interface representation of spatial thinking and speaking". Journal of Memory and Language. 48 (1): 16–32. doi:10.1016/S0749-596X(02)00505-3. hdl:11858/00-001M-0000-0013-1ED2-4.
- Mumford, Katherine H.; Kita, Sotaro (May 2014). "Children Use Gesture to Interpret Novel Verb Meanings" (PDF). Child Development. 85 (3): 1181–1189. doi:10.1111/cdev.12188. PMID 24266553.
- Senghas, Ann; Kita, Sotaro; Özyürek, Asli (17 September 2004). "Children Creating Core Properties of Language: Evidence from an Emerging Sign Language in Nicaragua". Science. 305 (5691): 1779–1782. Bibcode:2004Sci...305.1779S. doi:10.1126/science.1100199. hdl:11858/00-001M-0000-0013-1AEF-8. PMID 15375269. S2CID 145088158.
