= Dan Slobin =

American linguist

Dan I. Slobin
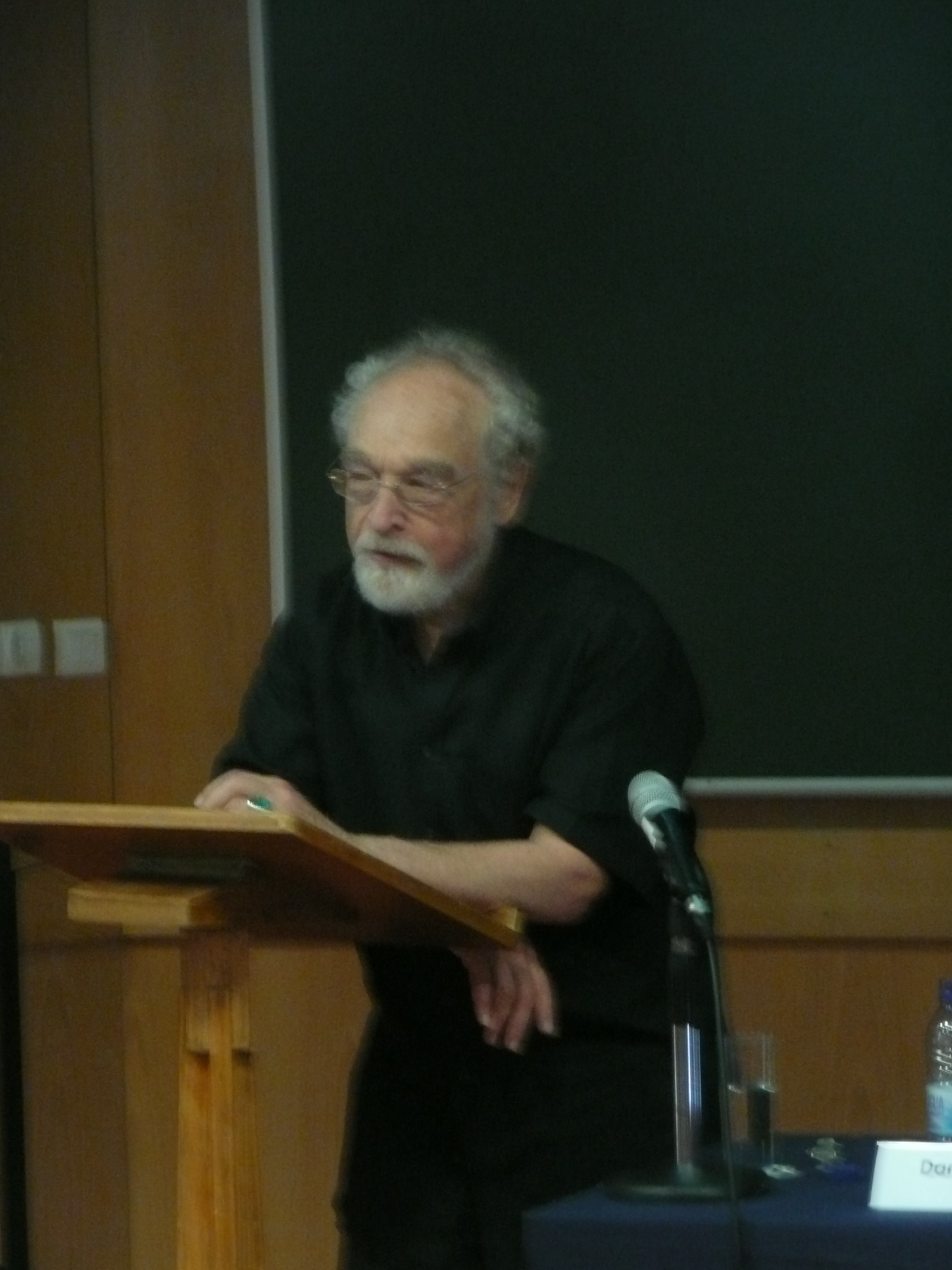
- Born: May 7, 1939 (age 87); Detroit, Michigan
- Education: University of Michigan, Harvard University
- Known for: Studies of crosslinguistic language acquisition
- Scientific career
- Fields: Linguistics, Psychology
- Workplaces: University of California, Berkeley
- Doctoral students: Leonard Talmy; Brian MacWhinney

Dan Isaac Slobin (born May 7, 1939) is a professor emeritus of psychology and linguistics at the University of California, Berkeley. Slobin has made major contributions to the study of children's language acquisition, and his work has demonstrated the importance of cross-linguistic comparison for the study of language acquisition and psycholinguistics in general.

Slobin received a B.A. in psychology from the University of Michigan in 1960 and a Ph.D. in social psychology from Harvard University in 1964. In addition to working at the University of California, Berkeley, Slobin has served as a visiting professor at several universities around the world, including Boğaziçi University, Tel-Aviv University, Max Planck Institute for Psycholinguistics, Centre National de la Recherche Scientifique (CNRS), and Stanford University.

== Research work ==
Slobin has extensively studied the organization of information about spatial relations and motion events by speakers of different languages, including both children and adults. He has argued that becoming a competent speaker of a language requires learning certain language-specific modes of thinking, which he dubbed "thinking for speaking". Slobin's "thinking for speaking" view can be described as a contemporary, moderate version of the Sapir–Whorf hypothesis, which claims that the language we learn shapes the way we perceive reality and think about it. This view is often contrasted with the "language acquisition device" view of Noam Chomsky and others, who think of language acquisition as a process largely independent of learning and cognitive development.

Slobin is also known for his pioneering research on child language development, in which he has taken a crosslinguistic approach. One seminal study, conducted with Thomas Bever, compared the acquisition of word order in children acquiring English, Italian, Serbo-Croatian, and Turkish. Results revealed that children's pattern of comprehension depends on the canonical patterns of the target language.

== Other work ==
Slobin also designed a project, along with Ruth Berman in the beginning of 1980. He created "The frog-story project", a research tool which was a children's storybook that tells a story in 24 pictures with no words (Frog Where Are You? by Mercer Mayer). This makes it possible to elicit narratives that are comparable in content but differing in form, across age and languages. There is now data from dozens of languages and most of the world's major language types. The Berman & Slobin study compared English, German, Spanish, Hebrew and Turkish on a range of dimensions.

His project was also mentioned in Raphael Berthele, a professor in the University of Fribourg, Switzerland on her work in the Crosslinguistic approaches to the psychology approach by Elena Lieven, Jiansheng Guo.
