= CHILDES =

Speech corpus established in 1984

The Child Language Data Exchange System (CHILDES) is a corpus established in 1984 by Brian MacWhinney and Catherine Snow to serve as a central repository for data pertaining to first language acquisition. As of 2024, the repository included content (transcripts, audio, and video) in 48 languages from 436 different corpora, all of which are publicly available worldwide. CHILDES is currently directed and maintained by MacWhinney at Carnegie Mellon University.

The earliest transcripts in CHILDES date from the 1960s. During the early 1990s, as computational resources capable of easily manipulating the data volumes found in CHILDES became commonly available, there was a significant increase in the number of studies that made use of it.

CHILDES is predominantly used for analyzing the language of young children and the language used by their caregivers. In 2001, CHILDES was made into a component of the larger corpus TalkBank, which includes language data from aphasics, second language acquisition, conversation analysis, and classroom language learning.

== Database format ==
There are a variety of languages and ages represented in the CHILDES transcripts. Most transcripts are from spontaneous interactions and conversations. The transcriptions are coded in the CHAT (Codes for the Human Analysis of Transcripts) transcription format, which provides a standardized format for producing conversational transcripts. This system can be used to transcribe conversations with any type of language learner: children, second-language learners, and recovering aphasics. In addition to discourse-level transcription, the CHAT system also has options for phonological and morphological analysis.

The CLAN program was developed by Leonid Spektor and aids in transcription and analysis of the child language data included in CHILDES.

== Use in research ==
As of June 2025, Google Scholar reported 11,221 citations of CHILDES in its database.
