= Dying =

Final process of life

Dying is the final stage of life which will eventually lead to death. Diagnosing dying is a complex process of clinical decision-making, and most practice checklists facilitating this diagnosis are based on cancer diagnoses. Dying is a two-stage process in which clinical death occurs when a heart stops beating, and biological death occurs when brain cells start to die from a lack of oxygen.

== Signs of dying ==
The National Cancer Institute in the United States advises that the presence of some of the following signs may indicate that death is approaching:

- Drowsiness, increased sleep, and/or unresponsiveness (caused by changes in the patient's metabolism).
- Confusion about time, place, and/or identity of loved ones; restlessness; visions of people and places that are not present; pulling at bed linens or clothing (caused in part by changes in the patient's metabolism).
- Decreased socialization and withdrawal (caused by decreased oxygen to the brain, decreased blood flow, and mental preparation for dying).
- Decreased need for food and fluids, and loss of appetite (caused by the body's need to conserve energy and its decreasing ability to use food and fluids properly).
- Loss of bladder or bowel control (caused by the relaxing of muscles in the pelvic area).
- Darkened urine or decreased amount of urine (caused by slowing of kidney function and/or decreased fluid intake).
- Skin becoming cool to the touch, particularly the hands and feet; skin may become bluish in color, especially on the underside of the body (caused by decreased circulation to the extremities).
- Rattling or gurgling sounds while breathing, which may be loud (death rattle); breathing that is irregular and shallow; decreased number of breaths per minute; breathing that alternates between rapid and slow (caused by congestion from decreased fluid consumption, a buildup of waste products in the body, and/or a decrease in circulation to the organs).
- Turning of the head toward a light source (caused by decreasing vision).
- Increased difficulty controlling pain (caused by progression of the disease).
- Involuntary movements (called myoclonus), increased heart rate, hypertension followed by hypotension, and loss of reflexes in the legs and arms are additional signs that the end of life is near.

== Cultural perspectives on dying ==
Cultural attitudes toward death vary significantly across societies and serve important existential and social functions. Many cultures use rituals, beliefs, and practices to process mortality, maintain social bonds, and reinforce a sense of continuity beyond physical death. In some cultures, emphasis is placed on rituals that support the dead and the community; in others, there is a greater focus on caring for the living, with death-related rituals having declined in importance. These cultural differences affect people's lifestyles, behaviours, and approach to death and dying.

=== Africa ===
In many African societies, death is viewed as a communal event with spiritual and social significance, though practices vary across regions and ethnic groups.

==== Asante and Ga ====
Among the Asante people of Ghana, death is perceived as a preordained event. Medical intervention to prolong life is often considered inappropriate, as it may interfere with one's destined path. Social obligations are fulfilled through elaborate funerals that affirm the continuing relationship between the living and the deceased. Ancestors are believed to play an active role in the lives of the living, offering protection, health, and fertility. In return, the living are expected to honour their ancestors through ritual and remembrance. Among the Ga people of southern Ghana, funeral customs include the use of figurative "fantasy coffins" (abebuu adekai), which are elaborately designed and symbolically represent the life or profession of the deceased.

==== Zulu ====
The Zulu of South Africa regard burial as a passage to the ancestral realm, marking the deceased's transition into an ongoing spiritual presence.

==== Hadza, !Kung Bushmen and Pygmy ====
For hunter-gatherer societies such as the Hadza of Northern Tanzania, the !Kung Bushmen of Botswana and Namibia and some Pygmy groups in Central Africa, mourning is generally short-lived and lacks elaborate rites. These groups often express little concern for an afterlife, a reflection of their immediate return economies, social organisations and values. The cooperative, egalitarian, and present-oriented nature of social structures results in limited investment in the past or future. Succession and inheritance are minimal concerns due to the absence of significant personal property.

==== Nyakyusa ====
The Nyakyusa of East Africa observe gender-differentiated rituals: women weep while men engage in dancing, fighting, and sexual activity. Property, in the form of cattle, is passed down the male line. If the deceased is male, he is believed to transform into a warrior spirit; if female, she becomes the mother of warriors. These rituals are expressions of masculinity and social renewal. Funeral ceremonies last approximately a month, allowing relatives to gather. Attendance at funerals is socially mandated; absence by relatives may signify a break in kinship ties, while villagers who do not attend may be suspected of witchcraft, as witches are believed to avoid their victims' funerals for fear of being exposed.

=== Western Societies ===
In many Western societies, death is viewed as both the biological and social end of the individual. Over time, the role of public ritual has diminished, replaced by more private, individualized mourning. This trend is linked to secularization and the increasing medicalization of death. Rather than occurring suddenly, death is often the result of chronic illness and prolonged decline—a shift that may introduce feelings of guilt, blame, or failure among survivors and caregivers.

In the United States, a pervasive "death-defying" culture leads to resistance against the process of dying. Death and illness are often conceived as things to "fight against", with conversations about death and dying considered morbid or taboo. Most people die in a hospital or nursing facility, with only around 30% dying at home. As the United States is a culturally diverse nation, attitudes towards death and dying vary according to cultural and spiritual factors.

Funerals involve the rapid movement of the deceased into a funeral parlour, embalming and a wake. Management of the deceased is largely given up to specialists or funeral directors. Embalming does not concern the afterlife, as with Egyptian mummies, but serves the purpose of presenting the deceased as 'peacefully sleeping' so as to protect mourners from bodily decomposition.

Death defying culture is not universal in the West - the rise in anticipated deaths has facilitated psychological and spiritual preparation death. Western cultures often seek to manage death through legal and symbolic mechanisms where they can construct a 'post self'. Wills, trusts, and advance directives allow individuals to exert control over their legacy. Practices such as memorial donations and naming public institutions after the deceased are forms of symbolic immortality, where the memory of the individual is preserved in public consciousness.

The shift of deaths occurring in later life due to long term illnesses may introduce feelings of guilt and blame if the deceased lifestyle choices caused or contributed to their illness. The protracted process may result in 'habituated grief' whereby relatives are accustomed to feeling grief during the life of the deceased and have reduced emotional capacity to grieve once the event of death occurs.

Awareness of impending death may also allow relatives adapt to loss, reconcile with loved ones and gain a sense of closure. Relatives have time to understand tasks previously managed by the deceased, allowing for psychological adjustment to life without them. They have the opportunity to reconcile with the deceased if they had any disagreements, and deaths occurring in hospitals relieves relatives of direct daily caring responsibilities.

=== China ===
In Chinese culture, death is viewed as the end of life — there is no afterlife — resulting in negative perceptions of dying. These attitudes towards death and dying originate from the three dominant religions in China: Taoism, Buddhism, and Confucianism.

=== South Pacific ===
In some cultures of the South Pacific, life is believed to leave a person's body when they are sick or asleep, making for multiple "deaths" in the span of one lifetime.

== Religious perspectives on dying ==
=== Christianity ===
In Christian belief, most people agree that believers will only experience death once; however, various traditions hold different beliefs about what happens during the intermediate state, the period between death and the universal resurrection. For many traditions, death is the separation of body and soul, so the soul continues to exist in a disembodied state. Other traditions believe that the soul and body are inseparable, meaning that the body's death renders the soul unconscious until the resurrection. Others believe that the spirit leaves the body to exist in heaven or hell.

=== Islam ===
In Islamic belief, the time of death is predetermined, with dying therefore perceived as the will of Allah. Dying is therefore considered as something to be accepted, with Muslims regularly encouraged to reflect upon death and dying. The majority of Muslims prefer to die at home, surrounded by their loved ones, with large numbers expected at the bedside of those who are dying.

=== Hinduism ===
In Hinduism, people are believed to die and be reborn with a new identity.

=== Buddhism ===
In Chinese Buddhism, it is said that dying patients will experience phases between the state of torment and the state of exultation, and that caretaker must help the dying patient remain in the state of exultation through Nianfo prayers. In some parts of Buddhism, the dead and living exist together, with the former having power and influence over the lives of the latter.

== Medicalization ==
=== Resuscitation ===
Resuscitation is the act of reviving of someone and is performed when someone is unconscious or dying. Resuscitation is performed using a variety of techniques; of these, the most common is cardiopulmonary resuscitation (CPR). CPR is a procedure consisting of cycles of chest compressions and ventilation support with the goal of maintaining blood flow and oxygen to the vital organs of the body. Defibrillation, or shock, is also provided following CPR in an attempt to jump start the heart. Emergency Medical Services (EMS) are often the first to administer CPR to patients outside of the hospital. Although EMS are not able to pronounce death, they are asked to determine the presence of clear signs of death and gauge whether CPR should be attempted or not. CPR is not indicated if the provider is at risk of harm or injury while attempting CPR, if clear signs of death are present (rigor mortis, dependent lividity, decapitation, transection, decomposition, etc.), or if the patient is exempt from resuscitation. Exemption is typically the case when the patient has an advance directive, a Physician Orders for Life-Sustaining Treatment (POLST) form indicating that resuscitation is not desired, or a valid Do Not Attempt Resuscitation (DNAR) order.

=== End-of-life care ===
End-of-life care is oriented towards a natural stage in the process of living, unlike other conditions. The National Hospice and Palliative Care Organization (NHPCO) states that hospice care or end-of-life care begins when curative treatments are no longer possible, and a person is diagnosed with a terminal illness with less than six months to live. Hospice care involves palliative care aimed at providing comfort for patients and support for loved ones. This process integrates medical care, pain management, as well as social and emotional support provided by social workers and other members of the healthcare team including family physicians, nurses, counselors, trained volunteers, and home health aides. Hospice care is associated with enhanced symptom relief, facilitates achievement of end-of-life wishes, and results in higher quality of end-of-life care compared with standard care involving extensive hospitalization.

== Psychological adjustment processes ==
When a person realizes that their life is threatened by a fatal illness, they come to terms with it and with their approaching end. This confrontation has been described in diaries, autobiographies, medical reports, novels, and also in poetry. Since the middle of the 20th century, the "fight" against death has been researched in the social sciences on the basis of empirical data and field research. The developed theories and models are intended to serve helpers in the accompaniment of terminally ill people above anything else.

The theories of dying describe psychosocial aspects of dying as well as models for the dying process. Particularly highlighted psychosocial aspects are: Total Pain (C. Saunders), Acceptance (J. M. Hinton, Kübler-Ross), Awareness/Insecurity (B.Glaser, A.Strauß), Response to Challenges (E.S.Shneidman), Appropriateness (A. D. Weisman), Autonomy (H.Müller-Busch), Fear (R. Kastenbaum, G.D.Borasio) and Ambivalence (E. Engelke).

=== Phase and stage models ===
There have been many phase and stage models for the course of dying developed from a psychological and psychosocial perspective. A distinction is made between three and twelve phases that a dying person goes through.

A more recently developed and revised phase model is the Illness Constellation Model, first published in 1991. The phases are associated with shock, dizziness, and uncertainty at the first symptoms and diagnosis; changing emotional states and thoughts, efforts to maintain control over one's own life; withdrawal, grief over lost abilities, and suffering from the imminent loss of one's own existence; finally psycho-physical decline.

The best known is the Five stages of Grief Model developed by Elisabeth Kübler-Ross, a Swiss-US psychiatrist. In her work, Kübler-Ross compiled various preexisting findings of Thanatology published by John Hinton, Cicely Saunders, Barney G. Glaser and Anselm L. Strauss and others. Because of this, she brought the public's attention to it more than it previously received, which has continued to this day. She focused on the treatment of the dying, with grief and mourning, as well as with studies on death and near-death experiences. The five stages in this model are the following: Denial and Isolation, Anger, Bargaining, Depression, and Consent. According to Kübler-Ross, hope is almost always present in each of the five phases, suggesting that the patients never completely give up and that hope must not be taken away from them. Loss of hope is soon followed by death, and the fear of death can only be overcome by everyone starting with themselves and accepting their own death, according to Kübler-Ross. From Kübler-Ross's research, psychiatrists have set new impulses for dealing with dying and grieving people. Her key message was that the people aiding must first clarify their own fears and life problems ("unfinished business") as far as possible and accept their own death before they can turn to the dying in a helpful way. The five phases of dying were extracted by Kübler-Ross from interviews of terminally ill people describing psychological adjustment processes in the dying process. The five phases are widely referred to, although Kübler-Ross herself critically questions the validity of her phase model several times. Some of her self-critiques include the following: The phases are not experienced in a fixed order one after the other, but they can alternate or repeat; some phases may not be experienced at all; a final acceptance of one's own dying may not take place in every case. In end-of-life care, space is given to psychological conflict, but coping with the phases can rarely be influenced from the outside.

In international research on dying, there are a number of scientifically based objections to the phase model and to models that describe dying in terms of staged behaviors in general. Above all, the naïve use of the phase model is viewed critically and even in specialist books, hope–a central aspect of the phase model for Kübler-Ross–is not mentioned.

=== Influencing factors ===
The scientifically based criticism of phase models has led to forgoing defying the dying process in stages, and instead to elaborating on factors that influence the course of dying. Based on research findings from several sciences, Robert J. Kastenbaum says, "Individuality and universality combine in dying." In Kastenbaum's model, individual and societal attitudes influence our dying and how we deal with knowledge about dying and death. Influencing factors are age, gender, interpersonal relationships, the type of illness, the environment in which treatment takes place, religion, and culture. This model is the personal reality of the dying person, where fear, refusal, and acceptance form the core of the dying person's confrontation with death.

Ernst Engelke took up Kastenbaum's approach and developed it further with the thesis, "Just as each person's life is unique, so is their death unique. Nevertheless, there are similarities in the death of all people. According to this, all terminally ill people have in common that they are confronted with realizations, responsibilities, and constraints that are typical of dying." For example, a characteristic realization is that the illness is threatening their life. Typical constraints result from the disease, therapies, and side effects. In Engelke's model, the personal and unique aspects of death result from the interaction of many factors in coping with the realizations, responsibilities, and constraints. Important factors include the following: the genetic make-up, personality, life experience, physical, psychological, social, financial, religious, and spiritual resources; the type, degree, and duration of the disease, the consequences and side effects of treatment, the quality of medical treatment and care, the material surroundings (i.e. furnishings of the apartment, clinic, home); and the expectations, norms, and behavior of relatives, carers, doctors and the public. According to Engelke, the complexity of dying and the uniqueness of each dying person creates guidelines for communication with dying people.

=== Awareness ===
Along with medical professionals and relatives, sociologists and psychologists also engage in the question of whether it is ethical to inform terminally ill patients of the infaust prognosis, or the uncertain diagnosis. In 1965, the sociologists Barney G. Glaser and Anselm Strauss published the results of empirical studies where they derived four different types of Awareness of dying patients: Closed Awareness, Suspected Awareness, Mutual Pretense Awareness, and Open Awareness. In Closed Awareness, only relatives, caregivers, and medical professionals recognize the patient's condition; the patient themselves does not recognize their dying. In Suspected Awareness, the patient suspects what those around him know, but they are not told by relatives or medical professionals. In Mutual Pretense Awareness, all participants know about that the person is dying, but they behave as if they did not know. In Open Awareness, all participants behave according to their knowledge.

The Hospice Movement in the United Kingdom in particular has since advocated for open, truthful and trustful interaction. The situation does not become easier for all involved if difficult conversations are avoided; rather it intensifies and possibly leads to a disturbed relationship of trust between people, which makes further treatment more difficult or impossible.

== See also ==
- Assisted dying – Medical aid in dying
- Assisted suicide – Suicide undertaken with aid from another person
- End-of-life care – Health care for a person nearing the end of their life
- Euthanasia – Intentionally ending a life to relieve pain and suffering
- Last rites – Christian prayers and ministrations given before death
- Near-death experience – Personal experiences associated with death or impending death
- Right to die – Moral and legal concept
- Terminal illness – Incurable fatal disease
- Voluntary euthanasia – Medical request to end one's own life
- Mortality rate – Deaths per 1,000 individuals per year
