= Awareness contexts =

Awareness contexts refers to the varying levels of knowledge or suspicion that both patients and medical staff possess about the health status of the patient. The term is generally used in the context of terminally ill patients. It was "the first comprehensive sociological exploration of the process of dying", and it is credit with aiding activism improving the rights of terminally ill patients.

The concept was introduced by sociologists Barney Glaser and Anselm Strauss in their 1965 book Awareness of Dying. Aware contexts can be closed, open or suspicion awareness based on the differences in the way people engage in different behaviors within the awareness context.

Awareness context is classified as closed if the patient does not know but suspects her condition in varying degrees so that she goes on the offensive while the hospital staff carefully and cannily assumes the defensive position in a contest for interactional control. The open awareness context, on the other hand, is a situation where everyone is aware of the condition of the patient. It is distinguished from mutual pretense where everyone knows about the condition but they pretend that they do not or that the patient may recover if he or she is already dying.
