= Kathy Charmaz =

American sociologist (1939–2020)

Kathleen Marian Charmaz (August 19, 1939 – July 27, 2020) was the developer of constructivist grounded theory, a major research method in qualitative research internationally and across many disciplines and professions. She was professor emerita of sociology at Sonoma State University, Rohnert Park, California, and former director of its Faculty Writing Program. Charmaz's background was in occupational therapy and sociology. Charmaz's areas of expertise included grounded theory, symbolic interactionism, chronicity, death and dying, qualitative health research, scholarly writing, sociological theory, social psychology, research methods, health and medicine, aging, sociology of emotions, and the body.

== Early life and education ==
Charmaz was born on August 19, 1939, in Whitehall, Wisconsin to Robert and Lorraine Calkins. Her father was a civil engineer and moved her family (including an older sister) to various locations in Pennsylvania where she lived most of her early life. In 1970, she married Stephen Charmaz. Her undergraduate degree, a bachelor of fine arts in occupational therapy (OT), was obtained in 1962 from a 5-year program at the University of Kansas. She then worked as a registered therapist in San Francisco for several years before returning to university with the intention of teaching OT students. At that time, OT instructors typically had master's degrees in other fields. Charmaz went to San Francisco State University for an MA in sociology, obtaining a strong academic background in sociological theory. Her thesis, “The social organization of a rehabilitation unit” (1969, 260 pps), was based on ethnographic observations of clinical practice and patients’ lives in a rehab unit for three days per week over one year. Next Charmaz was hired as a researcher at a rehabilitation center while continuing her ethnographic research.

== Academic career ==
In 1968, Charmaz was accepted into the first cohort of the new Doctoral Program in Sociology at the University of California, San Francisco (UCSF). At that time, it was a general sociology program, and half of her peers were interested in urban sociology. In contrast, Charmaz's interests were in medical sociology, social psychology, and sociological theory. Her program included six courses of qualitative analysis. She worked primarily with Anselm Strauss, her dissertation chair, and Barney Glaser, the founders of grounded theory research. Charmaz received her PhD in sociology in 1973, with a dissertation titled Time and Identity: The shaping of selves of the chronically ill.

Charmaz was appointed as a temporary assistant professor of sociology at Sacramento State College in 1972. She accepted a position at Sonoma State University in 1973 as a temporary assistant professor of sociology, which was converted to a tenure-track appointment in 1974. She was promoted to associate professor in 1977 and to professor in 1981. She became professor emerita in 2016. At Sonoma State, Charmaz developed and taught diverse courses to undergraduate and graduate students in gerontology and created professional development courses for social scientists and other researchers both nationally and internationally. These courses included Constructivist Grounded Theory, Grounded Theory for Social Justice Research, Writing Rites for Qualitative Researchers, Academic Writing and Publishing, Intensive Interviewing, Qualitative Analysis, Social Psychology. Social Psychology of Health and Illness, and Symbolic Interactionism.

Charmaz served as editor of the scholarly journal Symbolic Interaction from 1999 to 2003, and became president of the Society for the Study of Symbolic Interaction] 2009–2010. Charmaz was elected president of the Pacific Sociological Association (1999–2000). She also served on the editorial boards of 23 journals in qualitative inquiry and medical sociology and chaired major committees for the Medical Sociology Section of the American Sociological Association. She was an invited guest professor in Australia, Norway, Netherlands, Austria, New Zealand, and Japan.

== Constructivist grounded theory ==
As a graduate student at UCSF, Charmaz was dissatisfied with some of the dictums taught by Strauss and Glaser within grounded theory. For example, Glaser recommended that notes be taken during interviews, rather than recording and transcribing the interviews. She felt these procedures diminished the quality of her dissertation, which was based on 55 interviews of participants who had multiple chronic illnesses. Following the dissertation defense, she continued collecting data, both interviews and observational, and developing the analysis. In 1991, she published this research as Good Days, Bad Days: The Self in Chronic Illness and Time (1991). The book was awarded the 1992 Charles Horton Cooley Award from the Society for the study of Symbolic Interaction.

During her tenure at Sonoma State University, Charmaz continued collaborations with colleagues at the Department of Social and Behavioral Sciences UCSF and continued writing, consulting, and conducting workshops in grounded theory. During the 1980s–1990s, her writings focused on symbolic interactionism and the psychosocial processes of chronic illness and dying. In addition to Good Days, Bad Days, she wrote books on aging and illness during this period, including The Social Reality of Death (1980) and Aging, the Self and Community (1992), co-edited with Jaber Gubrium.

Charmaz's extensive exploration of the theoretical underpinnings of sociological theory (including Kuhn's Structure of Scientific Revolutions), her clinical experiences in occupational therapy working with the chronically ill and dying, and her intense five-year tenure with Strauss and Glaser and other faculty in her doctoral program, led to her reinterpretation of grounded theory and development of fresh and innovative constructivist methodological guidelines. In 1990, Charmaz published an article describing her new approach to grounded theory and how this approach differed from those of Glaser and Strauss. In this article, she first explained her social constructivist perspective (from medical sociology) as “one variation” of grounded theory, one that takes analysis “a step further” finding out how each concept “develops, changes and gives rise to the consequences.” Constructivist grounded theory “shifts the epistemological foundation of the original versions and integrates methodological innovations in qualitative inquiry occurring over the past 59 years.”

Her first grounded theory text, Constructing Grounded Theory: A Practical Guide Through Qualitative Analysis (2006) was translated into Chinese, Japanese, Korean, Polish, and Portuguese. It received a book award from the American Educational Studies Association and was expanded into a second edition in 2014. With Adele Clarke, she compiled a four-volume reference set of previously published works about or using the new methods, Grounded Theory and Situational Analysis (2014) in the SAGE Benchmarks in Social Research Methods series. In Developing Grounded Theory: The Second Generation (Morse et al., 2009, 2020), Charmaz's constructivist grounded theory is shown as a type of grounded theory, derived from both Glaserian and Straussian versions of this methodology. Most recently, she co-edited with Anthony Bryant two research handbooks on grounded theory (2007, 2019), drawing together works from authors in many countries.

== Critical social justice ==
Charmaz developed her own interests in constructivist grounded theory through applying it to critical social justice research. Grounded theory supplies the analytic tools to move social justice research beyond description. She noted that: “justice and injustice are abstract concepts, they are, moreover, enacted processes, made real through actions performed again and again. Grounded theorists can offer integrated theoretical statements about the conditions under which injustice or justice develops, changes, or continues.” The critical aspect of inquiry was imperative, focusing on the “plight of disadvantaged peoples and the effect of structural inequities.” She presented from Good Days, Bad Days: The Self in Chronic Illness and Time at conferences and argued the significance of grounded theory at workshops. Recently, she published an extensive review of 40 projects using critical inquiry and constructivist grounded theory.

== Academic writing ==
As she completed her dissertation, Anselm Strauss counseled Charmaz: Her dissertation was very theoretical and dense and poorly written. Although she had published as a graduate student, Strauss said, "She can’t write so she's got to get a teaching job." Charmaz took this to heart: She took a teaching position, developed her writing intensively, and remained an active researcher and methodologist.

At Sonoma State University she took classes in writing, developing her writing skills to the extent that from 1996 to 2016 she served as the director of the University Writing Program, as well as teaching courses on English composition and on critical analysis in written and oral expression. As an author in her own right, Charmaz published 14 books, 63 chapters, 33 articles, 16 encyclopedia entries, and 33 book reviews, while actively mentoring many researchers on their writing.

== Death ==
Charmaz died of cancer at the age of 80 on July 27, 2020.

== Key works ==
=== Selected books ===
- 2019 Antony Bryant & Kathy Charmaz (eds.) The SAGE Handbook of Current Developments in Grounded Theory. London: Sage.
- 2014 Kathy Charmaz. Constructing Grounded Theory 2nd ed. London: Sage.
- 2014 Adele E. Clarke and Kathy Charmaz (Eds.), SAGE Benchmarks in Social Research Methods 4-Volume Set: Grounded Theory and Situational Analysis. London: Sage.

Volume I: The History and Essentials of Grounded Theory Volume II: Grounded Theory in Disciplines and Research Volume III: Grounded Theory Exemplars across Disciplines Volume IV: Situational Analysis: Essentials and Exemplars

- 2011. Charmaz, K., & McMullen, L. M. (2011). Five ways of doing qualitative analysis: Phenomenological psychology, grounded theory, discourse analysis, narrative research, and intuitive inquiry. Guilford Press.
- 2007. Antony Bryant & Kathy Charmaz (eds.) Handbook of Grounded Theory. London: Sage.
- 2006 Kathy Charmaz. Constructing Grounded Theory: A Practical Guide Through Qualitative Analysis. London: Sage.
- 1991 Kathy Charmaz, Good Days, Bad Days: The Self in Chronic Illness and Time. New Brunswick, NJ: Rutgers University Press.

=== Selected articles and chapters ===
- 2020. Charmaz, K., & Thornberg, R. (2020). The pursuit of quality in grounded theory. Qualitative Research in Psychology, doi:10.1080/14780887.2020.1780357
- 2019. Charmaz, K. “With constructivist grounded theory you can’t hide”: Social Justice Research and Critical Inquiry in the Public Sphere. Qualitative Inquiry. doi:10.1177/1077800419879081
- 2017. Charmaz, K. (2017). The power of constructivist grounded theory for critical inquiry. Qualitative Inquiry, 23(1), 34–45.doi:10.1177/1077800416657105.
- 2015 Teaching Theory Construction with Initial Grounded Theory Tools: A Reflection on Lessons and Learning. Qualitative Health Research 25(12): 1610–1622. Published on-line December 8, 2015. doi:10.1177/1049732315613982
- 2012 Charmaz, K., & Belgrave, L. (2012). Qualitative interviewing and grounded theory analysis. The SAGE handbook of interview research: The complexity of the craft, 2, 347–365.
- 2009. Charmaz, K. Shifting the grounds: Constructivist grounded theory methods. Developing grounded theory: The second generation,(ed. J.M Morse) New York: Routledge pp. 127–154.
- 2008 Charmaz, K. (2008). Grounded theory as an emergent method. Handbook of emergent methods, 155, 172.
- 2006 Puddephatt, A. J. (2006). An interview with Kathy Charmaz: On constructing grounded theory. Qualitative sociology review, 2(3).
- 2005. Charmaz, K. Grounded theory in the 21st century: A qualitative method for advancing social justice research. (p. 507-535). Handbook of qualitative research (ed. Norman Denzin & Yvonna Lincoln), Thousand Oaks, CA, Sage.
- 2004. Charmaz, K. (2004). Premises, principles, and practices in qualitative research: Revisiting the foundations. Qualitative Health Research, 14(7), 976–993.
- Charmaz, K. (2000). Experiencing chronic illness. Handbook of social studies in health and medicine, p. 277-292.
- 1999 Charmaz, K. Stories of suffering: Subjective tales and research narratives. Qualitative Health Research, 9(3), 362–382.
- 1995. Charmaz, K. The body, identity, and self: Adapting to impairment. Sociological Quarterly, 36(4), 657–680.
- 1983 Charmaz, K. (1983). Loss of self: a fundamental form of suffering in the chronically ill. Sociology of Health & Illness, 5(2), 168–195.

=== Major keynote addresses ===
Kathy presented a total of 88 invited addresses and major presentations. Most notably:

- 2018. "Experiencing Exclusion and Stigma: The Influence of Perspectives, Practices, and Policies on Living with Chronic Illness and Disability.” Couch Stone Symposium of the Society for the Study of Symbolic Interactionism and the European SSSI, Lancaster University, Lancaster, UK.
- 2016. “Continuities, Contradictions, and Critical Inquiry in Grounded Theory,” Qualitative Health Research Conference, Kelowna, BC, Canada.
- 2015. “The Power of Stories, the Potential of Theorizing for Social Justice Studies,” International Congress of Qualitative Inquiry, Urbana, IL.
- 2014. “Continuities and Contradictions in Grounded Theory,” Sponsored by the Institute of Advanced Studies, Vienna.
- 2012. “The Power and Potential of Grounded Theory for Medical Sociologists,” British Sociological Association Medical Sociology Annual Conference, University of Leicester, Leicester, UK.
- 2008. “Advancing Qualitative Research through Grounded Theory,” Qualitative Research Conference, University of Bournemouth, Bournemouth, UK.
- 2006. “Views from the Margins: Voices, Silences, and Suffering,” International Conference on Qualitative Research and Marginalisation, organized by the Department of Psychology, University of Leicester, Leicester, UK.
