= The Discovery of Grounded Theory =

1967 academic text on sociology

- Author: Barney Glaser and Anselm Strauss
- Language: English
- Subject: grounded theory
- Publisher: Aldine Transaction
- Publication date: 1967
- Publication place: United States
- ISBN: 0-202-30260-1

The Discovery of Grounded Theory is a 1967 book (ISBN 0-202-30260-1) by Barney Glaser and Anselm Strauss on grounded theory.

After their success with Awareness of Dying, Glaser and Strauss decided to write a book on methodology. The Discovery of Grounded Theory was meant to invite and motivate people to use the newly developed methodology. Unlike later works, it does not provide much advice on how to put the theory into practice.

The authors had several goals in mind when writing the book:

- Legitimize qualitative research. Having a reference book by established authors helped students defend qualitative studies, which were not widely accepted at the time.
- Criticize functionalists like Talcott Parsons, and his student Robert K. Merton, who in turn had been a teacher of Barney Glaser.
- Demonstrate the possibility of building theories from data, something that many qualitative researchers doubt to this day, instead choosing to stick with mere ethnographic descriptions.
