= Theoretical sampling =

Theoretical sampling is a process of data collection for generating theory whereby the analyst jointly collects codes and analyses data and decides what data to collect next and where to find them, in order to develop a theory as it emerges. The initial stage of data collection depends largely on a general subject or problem area, which is based on the analyst's general perspective of the subject area. The initial decisions are not based on a preconceived theoretical framework. The researcher begins by identifying some key concepts and features which they will research about. This gives a foundation for the research. A researcher must be theoretically sensitive so that a theory can be conceptualized and formulated as it emerges from the data being collected. Caution must be taken so as to not limit oneself to specific aspects of a theory; this will make a researcher blind towards other concepts and aspects of the theory. The main question in this method of sampling is this: what groups should the researcher turn to next in the data collection process, and why?

== History of theoretical sampling ==
According to Chenitz and Swanson (1986), theoretical sampling emerged with the foundation of grounded theory, which was first developed by Glaser and Strauss in 1967. Grounded theory can be described as a research approach for the collection and analysis of qualitative data for the purpose of generating explanatory theory, in order to understand various social and psychological phenomena. Its focus is to develop a theory from continuous comparative analysis of data collected by theoretical sampling.

== Advantages and disadvantages ==
The main advantage of theoretical sampling is that it strengthens the rigour of the study if the study attempts to generate the theory in the research area. The application of theoretical sampling provides a structure to data collection as well as data analysis. It is based on the need to collect more data to examine categories and their relationships and assures that representativeness exists in the category. Theoretical sampling has inductive as well as deductive characteristics. It is very flexible as the researcher can make shifts in plans and emphasize early in the research process so that the data gathered reflects what is occurring in the field.

Certain disadvantages may be associated with this sampling method. It is a highly systematic method due to which application of theoretical sampling requires more resources like time and money as compared to other sampling methods. It is a very complicated method and not easy to understand. To achieve depth in developing the categories researcher proceeds to another location to increase breadth in the category which sounds very complex and indeed is not helpful for the novice and may be problematic.

== Key features ==
While discussing theoretical sampling, there are three features that must be considered:

1. Choosing cases in terms of the theory

In this feature, the basis is constructed on an ideal universe or a wider universe where there is a larger comprehension or social explanation according to which the researcher is able to construct their theory. This theoretical universe will allow for better-formulated samples which are more meaningful and sensible than others. This kind of sample will also be a wider representative sample. So in this type of sampling, we select samples that have a particular process, examples, categories and even types that are relevant to the ideal or wider universe. One of the most commonly given example is of discourse analysis of gender. The sample relevant units in qualitative research are very often viewed as theoretically defined. This basically means that attributes such as gender, ethnicity and even age can't be the basis for a sample. This is due to the fact that most often attributions are themselves the topic of the research.

2. Choosing deviant cases

One of the leading philosophies in theoretical sampling is the fact that the researcher doesn't choose cases that are supportive to their argument. In theoretical sampling the belief is that researchers need to overcome the tendency to select cases and instances that support their side of the argument. Instead it states that it would be more beneficial to look out for negative instances and cases which are defined by the theory that we are working with. This feature basically states that a researcher should not exclude any fact from the process of research just because it seems impossible. Researchers should insist on the fact that if they imagine it then it can't be impossible.

3. Changing the size of your sample during the course of the research

The first two features of a theoretical sample deals with issues right at the beginning of the research project. The third feature however deals with concerns or application during the process of the research. One of the advantages the qualitative research as a whole has over quantitative research is its flexibility. In theoretical sampling the researcher manipulates or changes the theory, sampling activities as well as the analysis during the course of the research. Flexibility occurs in this style of sampling when the researchers want to increase the sample size due to new factors that arise during the research. Flexibility also occurs when the researcher's wishes to use a small sample during the initial stages of the research but increase the sample size to test developing generalizations. Finally flexibility is also allowed when the researcher finds unexpected generalization and wants to look into deviant cases.

== Sampling strategies ==
In theoretical sampling, there are two main criteria for initial data collection, general sociological perspective and problem area. Collection criteria for the future cannot be planned in advance as the criterion emerges as the theory evolves.

Which groups are included? To study this often multiple comparison groups are used. The groups are chosen based on the theoretical criteria or relevance. Sociologists or researchers often evade the problem by studying only one group and trying to describe the subgroups. Often the differences among the groups or sub groups are just stated but a theoretical analysis is not conducted. One of the advantages here is that the analyst has the liberty to adjust their control of the data collection, to ensure that the data is relevant to the emerging theory. Also, usually groups are chosen only for a single comparison, therefore there is usually no pre-planned or definite set of groups for all the categories. Another interesting fact is that it is almost impossible to cite the number of groups and the type of groups until the research is completed. One of the major differences with comparative analysis is that comparative analysis focus on the verification and description using accurate evidence.

Why are groups selected? Comparing groups gives the researcher the advantage of development of variety of categories. The main criterion is that the data collected should apply to a particular category or property, irrespective of the differences or similarities. The researcher's main focus is to keep the purpose of the research clear. As the researcher compares groups, he gains control over two scales of generality. They are: 1. Conceptual level 2. Population scope Also differences and similarities can either be maximised or minimised, depending on the type of groups being compared. This gives the researcher more control and helps them discover more categories. This then helps them to develop and relate to more theoretical properties which lead to enhancing the emerging theory. When the researcher minimises differences among groups, s/he is able to establish a definite set of conditions under which a category exists. Whereas on maximising, s/he is able to gather a variety of data with strategic similarities among the groups. Generally in theoretical sampling, the researcher aims at maximising differences as this brings about greater coverage in the variation among different aspects, making the theory more elaborate.

How are the groups selected? The researcher should actively search for data that is theoretically relevant. Rather than focusing on the group, greater focus should be placed on the emerging theory. The larger the contrast between the groups, the greater will be the probability of evident comparison between the two. As the research progresses and the researcher studies the same group or different sub-groups, s/he then arrives at few categories, which on saturation generate their theory.

== Uses of theoretical sampling ==
Initially, theoretical sampling is used only for a pragmatic purpose of generating a theory. The ability to generate an extensive understanding of a completely well theory defined in any field through research takes in the account of theoretical sampling. It first focuses on the problem area and then into the various approaches that need the basis of grounded theory. For example, how confident men handle prospective marks or how policemen act toward people of African descent or what happens to students in medical school that turns them into doctors, is dependent on the theoretical framework that the researcher arrives with. Theoretical sampling helps in exploring various hibernating research questions that are eventually evident in the data collection as a theory. According to Glaser and Holton (2004), Grounded theory that has a data collecting inclination towards theoretical sampling was first derived from qualitative sampling. Theoretical sampling methods are now considered as the diluted version of grounded theory that is now used in health care research where researcher may want to find out the different reasons for a particular illness to trigger in a particular kind of population. According to Sandelowski in 1995, although theoretical sampling is often misconstrued as purposive sampling, the uses of theoretical sampling vary to a large extent. Also, the selection criteria of participants for theoretical sampling changes according to the needs and changes that occur in the theoretical study at the given time. Theoretical sampling is considered to be purpose driven and it explicitly carries out its function on the basis of an emerging theory. The main focus of theoretical research is to use its development through a constant comparative analysis of data that is gained through theoretical sampling for a better understanding of the theory produced.

== Theoretical saturation ==
The concept of saturation was first defined in the context of grounded theory as theoretical saturation. In qualitative research the word saturation is extensively used almost interchangeably with data saturation, thematic saturation, theoretical saturation and conceptual saturation. Saturation can be simply defined as data satisfaction. It is when the researcher reaches a point where no new information is obtained from further data.

Saturation point determines the sample size in qualitative research as it indicates that adequate data has been collected for a detailed analysis. However, there are no fixed sizes or standard tests that determine the required data for reaching saturation. For example, in many phenomenographic studies, theoretical saturation is often reached after 15 to 30 participants, whereas other methods may require far fewer, or greater, numbers.

== Example of theoretical sampling ==
An example of theoretical sampling is best described by Glaser and Strauss in the 1960s. It is a memo from their research for “Awareness of Dying”. It explains how the search of data is active throughout the research process as the researcher keeps probing into other relevant theoretical questions- “Visits to the various medical services were scheduled as follows: I wished first to look at services that minimized patient awareness (and so first looked at premature baby service and then a neurosurgical service where patients were frequently comatose). I wished next to look at dying in a situation where expectancy of the staff was great and dying was quick, so I observed on an Intensive Care Unit. Then I wished to observe on a service where staff expectations of terminality were great but where patients might or might not be, and where dying tended to be slow. So I looked next at a cancer service. I wished then to look at conditions where death was unexpected and rapid, and so looked at an emergency service. While we were looking at some different types of services, we also observed the above types of serviced at other types of hospitals. So, our scheduling of types of services was directed by a general conceptual scheme- which included hypotheses about awareness, expectedness and rate of dying- as well as by a developing conceptual structure including matters not at first envisioned. Sometimes we returned to services after the initial two or three or four weeks of continuous observation, in order to check upon items which needed checking or had been missed in the initial period."

== See also ==
- Axial coding
- Grounded theory
- Sampling (statistics)
- Sampling (case studies)
