= Randomised non-comparative trial =

A randomised non-comparative trial, RNCT (or also non-comparative randomised trial), is a type of clinical trial where participants are randomised to different conditions (arms), but where the primary analysis involves comparing each arm separately to a historical control, predefined benchmark or something else, with no formal comparison between the two arms.

The study design appears to have arisen in oncology, where single-arm studies are not unusual. It promises reduced sample size requirements. An RNCT acts like multiple single-arm designs run concurrently. A review found RNCTs dating back to 2002, and having been used in high-profile oncology studies and also beyond oncology.

The design has been criticised by statisticians. It is unclear what benefit randomisation adds compared to running separate single-arm studies. Pavlos Msaouel described the use of the word "randomisation" as merely being "talismanic" in a 2025 article, it leading readers to think the study has the benefits of a randomised controlled trial (RCT). While the point of an RNCT is not to have a comparison between arms, about half of reported RNCTs still reported some sort of comparison.
