= Open coding =

Method of qualitative data analysis

Based in grounded theory, open coding is the analytic process through which concepts (codes) are attached to observed data and phenomena during qualitative data analysis. It is one of the techniques described by Strauss (1987) and Strauss and Corbin (1990) for working with text. Open coding attempts to codify, name or classify the observed phenomenon and is achieved by segmenting data into meaningful expressions and describing that data with a single word or short sequence of words. Relevant annotations and concepts are then attached to these expressions.

== Details ==
Applied in varying degrees of detail, open coding can be linked to a line, sentence, paragraph or complete text (e.g., protocol, scenario). Alternatives are selected according to the research question, relevant data, personal style of the analyst and the stage of research. However, coding should always follow its aim to break down and understand a text and develop a scheme of categories over the course of time.

The result of open coding should be a list of characteristic codes and categories attached to the text and supported by code notes to explain the content. These notes could take the form of interesting observations and thoughts that are relevant to the development of the theory.

Although the specific codes used by an analyst are exclusive to the research material and the analyst's style, researchers generally probe a text with targeted questions to:

- Identify the underlying issue and phenomenon (What?)
- Identify the persons and organizations involved and the roles they play (Who?)
- Identify the phenomenon's attributes (What kind?)
- Determine the time, course and location (When? How long? Where?)
- Identify the intensity (How much? How long?)
- Identify the reasons attached to the phenomenon (Why?)
- Identify intention or purpose (Why?)
- Strategies and tactics to achieve the goal (With what?)

== See also ==
- Grounded theory
- Axial coding
