= Robert T. Craig =

American academic (born 1947)

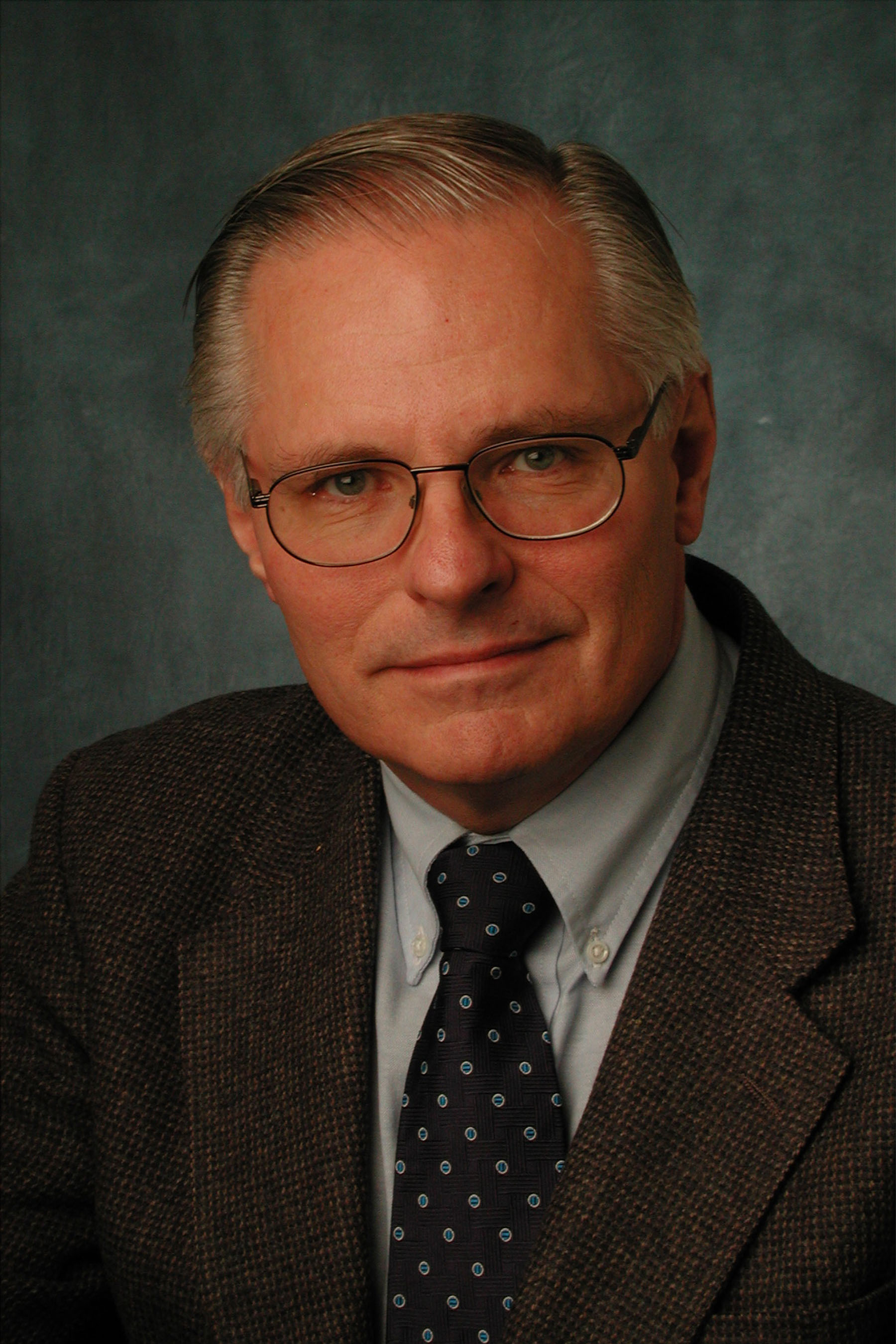
- Born: May 10, 1947 (age 79); Rochester, New York, U.S.
- Awards: Fellow and Past President of the International Communication Association (Lifetime Status); Best Article Award, International Communication Association, 2000; Golden Anniversary Monograph Award, National Communication Association, 2000

Education
- Education: University of Wisconsin–Madison (BA in speech); Michigan State University (MA and PhD in communication)

Philosophical work
- Era: Contemporary philosophy
- Region: Western philosophy
- School: Pragmatism
- Institutions: Pennsylvania State University; University of Illinois Chicago; Temple University; University of Colorado Boulder; University of Wisconsin–Madison; American University of Beirut
- Main interests: Communication theory, social constructionism
- Notable ideas: Grounded practical theory

Robert T. Craig (born May 10, 1947) is an American communication theorist from the University of Colorado, Boulder who received his BA in speech at the University of Wisconsin–Madison, and his MA and PhD in communication from Michigan State University. Craig was on the 1988 founding board of the journal "Research on Language and Social Interaction," a position he continues to hold. From 1991 to 1993 Craig was the founding editor of the International Communication Association journal "Communication Theory" which has been in continuous publication since 1991. He is currently the editor for the ICA Handbook series. In 2009 Craig was elected as a Lifetime Fellow for the International Communication Association, an organization he was president for in 2004–2005.

Craig's work "Communication Theory as a Field" received the Best Article Award from the International Communication Association as well as the Golden Anniversary Monograph Award from the National Communication Association. That work has since been translated into French and Russian. The theory presented in "Communication Theory as a Field" has become the basis of the book "Theorizing Communication" which Craig co-edited with Heidi Muller, as well as being adopted by several other communication theory textbooks as a new framework for understanding the field of communication theory.

== Grounded practical theory ==
In 1995, Robert T. Craig and Karen Tracy published "Grounded Practical Theory: The case of Intellectual Discussion"! This was an attempt by Craig and Tracy to create a methodological model using discourse analysis which will "guide the development and assessment of normative theories." Craig and Tracy argue that the communication discipline has been dominated by scientific theory which is concerned with what is, while normative theories are centrally concerned with what ought to be. This neglect of normative theories "limits the practical usefulness of communication studies."

Grounded practical theory (GPT) is a metatheoretical approach based on Craig's (1989) notion of communication as a practical, rather than scientific, discipline. The goal of communication as a practical discipline is to develop normative theories to guide practice. Based on this argument, GPT was developed as a methodologically grounded means of theorizing communication practices. GPT involves (1) reconstructing communicative practices, (2) redescribing those practices in less context-specific terms, and (3) identifying implicit principles which guide the practice. Generally a GPT study begins by looking for troubles or dilemmas endemic to situated interaction and observable in discourse. This constitutes the “problem level” and the “grounded” component of the GPT approach. Then, problems are reconstructed concretely and abstractly and matched with the techniques which participants employ for dealing with those problems. This constitutes the “technical level” and is an important part of the theorizing process. Finally, the ideals and standards shaping the practice and how to manage its problems and techniques constitute the “philosophical level.” This situates the practice both locally and generally for the purpose of normative critique. A methodological approach which is explicitly guided by GPT is action implicative discourse analysis (AIDA).

== Communication Theory as a Field ==
In 1999 Craig wrote a landmark article "Communication Theory as a Field" which expanded the conversation regarding disciplinary identity in the field of communication. At that time, communication theory textbooks had little to no agreement on how to present the field or what theories to include in their textbooks. This article has since become the foundational framework for four different textbooks to introduce the field of communication. In this article Craig "proposes a vision for communication theory that takes a huge step toward unifying this rather disparate field and addressing its complexities." To move toward this unifying vision Craig focused on communication theory as a practical discipline and shows how "various traditions of communication theory can be engaged in dialogue on the practice of communication." In this deliberative process theorists would engage in dialog about the "practical implications of communication theories." In the end Craig proposes seven different traditions of Communication Theory and outlines how each one of them would engage the others in dialogue.

Craig proposes that these seven suggested traditions of communication theory have emerged through research into communication, and each one has their own way of understanding communication. These seven traditions are:

1. Rhetorical: views communication as the practical art of discourse.
2. Semiotic: views communication as the mediation by signs.
3. Phenomenological: communication is the experience of dialogue with others.
4. Cybernetic: communication is the flow of information.
5. Socio-psychological: communication is the interaction of individuals.
6. Socio-cultural: communication is the production and reproduction of the social order.
7. Critical: communication is the process in which all assumptions can be challenged.

These proposed seven traditions of communication theory are then placed into conversation with each other on a table first to show how each tradition's different interpretation of communication defines the tradition's vocabulary, communication problems, and commonplaces, and next to show what argumentation between the traditions would look like.

Craig concluded this article with an open invitation to explore how the differences in these theories might shed light on key issues, show where new traditions could be created, and engaging communication theory with communication problems through metadiscourse. Craig further proposes several future traditions that could possibly be fit into the metamodel. A feminist tradition where communication is theorized as "connectedness to others", an aesthetic tradition theorizing communication as "embodied performance", an economic tradition theorizing communication as "exchange", and a spiritual tradition theorizing communication on a "nonmaterial or mystical plane of existence."

== Publications ==
=== Books and chapters ===
Year	Author	Chapter Title	Book Title	Page numbers	Editor	Publisher	ISBN
2010	Tracy, K.; Craig, R. T.	Studying Interaction in order to Cultivate Communicative Practices: Action-Implicative Discourse Analysis	New Adventures in Language and Interaction	145–166	Streech, J.	John Benjamins Publishing Company	ISBN 978-90-272-5600-3
2010	Tracy, K.; Craig, R. T	Framing Discourse as Argument in Appellate Courtrooms: Three Cases on Same-Sex Marriage	The Functions of Argument and Social Context, 2009	46–53	Gouran D. S.	National Communication Association	
2009	Craig, R. T.	Metatheory	Encyclopedia of Communication Theory, Vol. 2	657–661	Littlejohn, S. W.; Foss, K. A.	SAGE Publications	ISBN 978-1-4129-5937-7
2009	Craig, R. T.; Robles, J. S.	Pragmatics	Encyclopedia of Communication Theory, Vol. 2	790–794	Littlejohn, S. W.; Foss, K. A.	SAGE Publications	ISBN 978-1-4129-5937-7
2009	Craig, R. T.	Traditions of Communication Theory	Encyclopedia of Communication Theory, Vol. 2	958–963	Littlejohn, S. W.; Foss, K. A.	SAGE Publications	ISBN 978-1-4129-5937-7
2009	Barge, J. K.; Craig, R. T.	Practical Theory in Applied Communication Scholarship	Routledge Handbook of Applied Communication Research	55–78	Frey, R.; Cissna, K. N.	Routledge	ISBN 0-203-87164-2
2008	Craig, R. T.	Communication as a Field and Discipline	The International Encyclopedia of Communication Vol. II	675–688	Donsbach, W.	Blackwell Publishing	ISBN 1-4051-3199-3
2008	Craig, R. T.	Meta-discourse	The International Encyclopedia of Communication Vol. II	3707–3709	Donsbach, W.	Blackwell Publishing	ISBN 1-4051-3199-3
2007	Craig, R. T.' and Muller, H. L.		Theorizing Communication: Readings Across Traditions		Craig, R. T.; and Muller, H. L.	SAGE Publications	ISBN 978-1-4129-5237-8
2006	Craig, R. T.	Communication as a Practice	Communication as...: Perspectives on Theory	38–47	Shepherd, G. J.; John, J. ST.; and Striphas, T.	SAGE Publications	ISBN 978-1-4129-0658-6
2005	Craig, R. T.; Tracy, K.	"The Issue" in Argumentation Practice and Theory	Argumentation in Practice	11–28	Eemeren, F. H; Houtlosser, P.	John Benjamins Publishing Company	ISBN 90-272-1882-X
1990	Craig, R. T.	Multiple Goals in Discourse: An Epilogue (Reprint of Journal Article)	Multiple Goals in Discourse	163–170	Tracy, K.; Coupland, N.	Multilingual Matters Ltd.	ISBN 1-85359-099-1
1989	Craig R. T.	Communication as a Practical Discipline	Rethinking Communication; Volume 1: Paradigm Issues	97–122	Dervin B.; Grossberg L.; O'Keefe B., Wartella E.	SAGE Publications	ISBN 978-0-8039-3029-2
1993	Craig, R. T.; Tracy, K; Spisak, F.	The Discourse of Requests: Assessment of a Politeness Approach (Reprint of journal article)	Contemporary Perspectives on Interpersonal Communication	264–284	Petronio, S.; Alberts, J. K.; Hecht, M. L.; Buley, J.	Brown & Benchmark	ISBN 978-0-697-13356-4
1983	Craig, R. T.; Tracy, K.		Conversational Coherence: Form, Structure, and Strategy		Craig, R. T.; and Tracy, K.	SAGE Publications	ISBN 0-8039-2122-5

=== Journal articles ===
- Tracy, Karen; Craig, Robert T.; Smith, Martin; Spisak, Frances (1984). "The Discourse of Requests". Human Communication Research. 10 (4): 513–538. doi:10.1111/j.1468-2958.1984.tb00030.x.
- Craig, Robert T.; Tracy, Karen; Spisak, Frances (1986). "The Discourse of Requests". Human Communication Research. 12 (4): 437–468. doi:10.1111/j.1468-2958.1986.tb00087.x.
- Craig, Robert T. (1993). "Why Are There So Many Communication Theories?". Journal of Communication. 43 (3): 26–33. doi:10.1111/j.1460-2466.1993.tb01273.x.
- Craig, Robert T.; Tracy, Karen (1995). "Grounded Practical Theory: The Case of Intellectual Discussion". Communication Theory. 5 (3): 248–272. doi:10.1111/j.1468-2885.1995.tb00108.x.
- Craig, Robert T. (2001). "Minding my metamodel, mending Myers". Communication Theory. 11 (2): 231–240. doi:10.1111/j.1468-2885.2001.tb00241.x.
- Craig, Robert T. (2005). "How We Talk about How We Talk: Communication Theory in the Public Interest". Journal of Communication. 55 (4): 659–667. doi:10.1111/j.1460-2466.2005.tb03015.x.
- Craig, Robert T. (2007). "Pragmatism in the Field of Communication Theory". Communication Theory. 17 (2): 125–145. doi:10.1111/j.1468-2885.2007.00292.x.
- García-Jiménez, Leonarda; Craig, Robert T. (2010). "What Kind of Difference do We Want to Make?". Communication Monographs. 77 (4): 429–431. doi:10.1080/03637751.2010.523591. S2CID 144519840.
- Rich, Marc Howard; Craig, Robert T. (2012). "Habermas and Bateson in a World Gone M.A.D.: Metacommunication, Paradox, and the Inverted Speech Situation". Communication Theory. 22 (4): 383–402. doi:10.1111/j.1468-2885.2012.01412.x.

== See also ==
- Communication studies
- Communication Theory
- Grounded theory
- Metatheory
- Meta-ethics
- Metaphilosophy
