= Communication Theory as a Field =

1999 article by Robert T. Craig

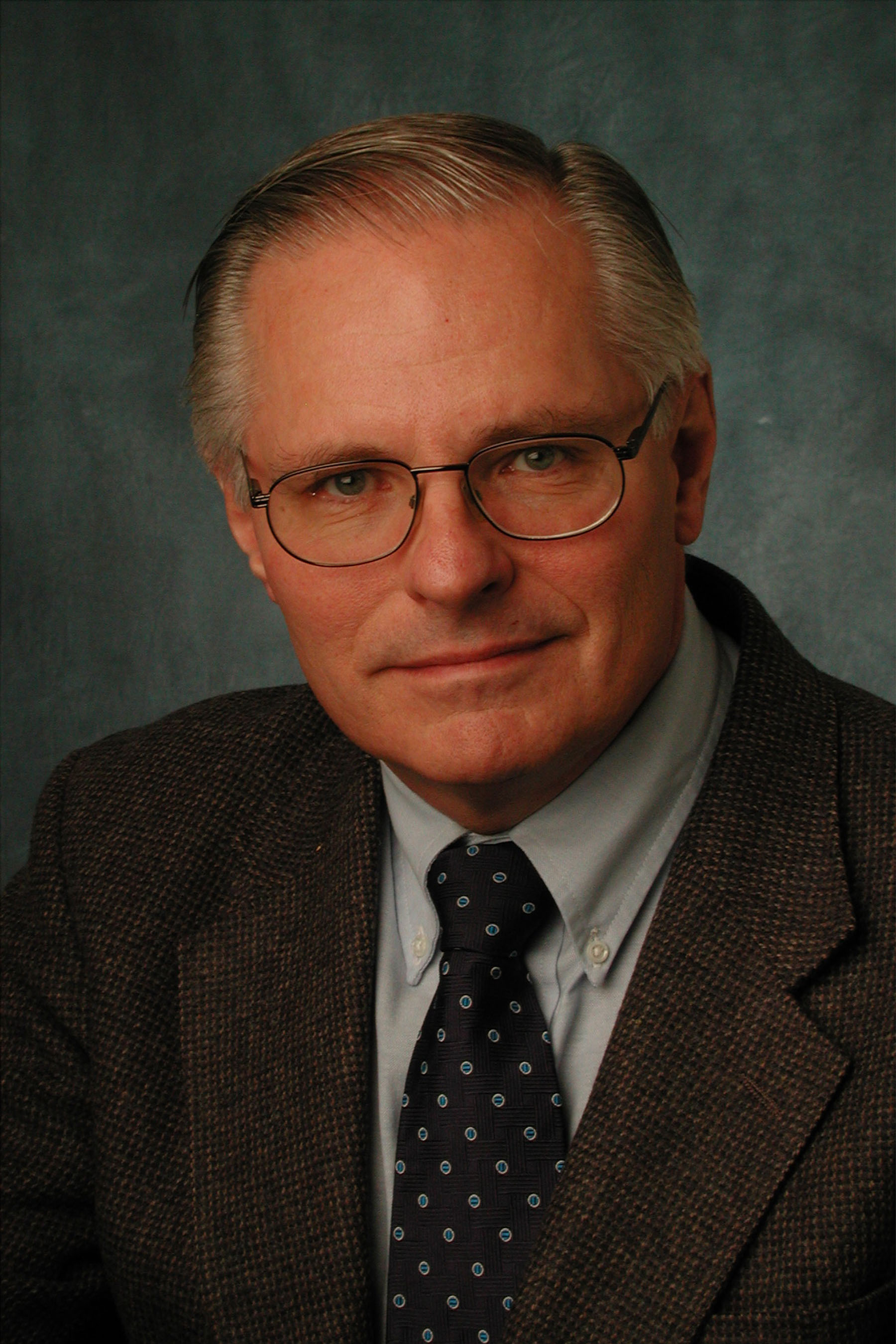
Robert T. Craig

"Communication Theory as a Field" is a 1999 article by Robert T. Craig, attempting to unify the academic field of communication theory.

Craig argues that communication theorists can become unified in dialogue by charting what he calls the "dialogical dialectical tension", or the similarities and differences in their understanding of "communication" and demonstrating how those elements create tension within the field. Craig mapped these similarities and differences into seven suggested traditions of communication theory and showed how each of these traditions understand communication, as well as how each tradition's understanding creates tension with the other traditions.

The article has received multiple awards, has become the foundation for many communication theory textbooks, and has been translated into several different languages.

"Communication theory as a field" has created two main dialogues between Craig and other theorists. Myers argued that Craig misrepresented the theoretical assumptions of his theory, and that the theory itself does not distinguish between good and bad theories. Craig responded that Myers misunderstood not only the basic argument of the article, but also misrepresented his own case study. Russill proposed pragmatism as an eighth tradition of communication theory, Craig responded by expanding this idea and placing Russill's proposition in conversation with the other seven traditions.

== Recognition and awards ==
"Communication Theory as a Field" has been recognized by multiple associations for its influence upon the field of communication. These awards include the Best Article Award from the International Communication Association as well as the Golden Anniversary Monograph Award from the National Communication Association. That work has since been translated into French and Russian. The theory presented in "Communication Theory as a Field" has become the basis of the book "Theorizing Communication" which Craig co-edited with Heidi Muller, as well as being adopted by several other communication theory textbooks as a new framework for understanding the field of communication theory.

== Metamodel ==
Sparked by the "Third Debate" within the field of International Relations Theory in the 1980s, "Communication Theory as a Field" expanded the conversation regarding disciplinary identity in the field of communication. At that time, communication theory textbooks had little to no agreement on how to present the field or which theories to include in their textbooks. This article has since become the foundational framework for four different textbooks to introduce the field of communication. In this article Craig "proposes a vision for communication theory that takes a huge step toward unifying this rather disparate field and addressing its complexities." To move toward this unifying vision Craig focused on communication theory as a practical discipline and shows how "various traditions of communication theory can be engaged in dialogue on the practice of communication." In this deliberative process theorists would engage in dialog about the "practical implications of communication theories." In the end Craig proposes seven different traditions of communication theory and outlines how each one of them would engage the others in dialogue.

Craig argues that while the study of communication and communication theory has become a rich and flourishing field "Communication theory as an identifiable field of study does not yet exist" and the field of communication theory has become fragmented into separate domains which simply ignore each other. This inability to engage in dialog with one another causes theorists to view communication from isolated viewpoints, and denies them the richness that is available when engaging different perspectives. Craig argues that communication theorists are all engaging in the study of practical communication. By doing so different traditions are able to have a common ground from which a dialog can form, albeit each taking a different perspective of communication. Through this process of forming a dialog between theorists with different viewpoints on communication "communication theory can fully engage with the ongoing practical discourse (or metadiscourse) about communication in society."

The communication discipline began not as a single discipline, but through many different disciplines independently researching communication. This interdisciplinary beginning has separated theorists through their different conceptions of communication, rather than unifying them in the common topic of communication. Craig argues that the solution to this incoherence in the field of communication is not a unified theory of communication, but to create a dialogue between these theorists which engages these differences with one another to create new understandings of communication.

To achieve this dialog Craig proposes what he calls "Dialogical-Dialectical coherence," or a "common awareness of certain complementaries and tensions among different types of communication theory." Craig believes that the different theories cannot develop in total isolation from one another, therefore this dialogical-dialectical coherence will provide a set of background assumptions from which different theories can engage each other in productive argumentation. Craig argues for a metatheory, or "second level" theory which deals with "first level" theories about communication. This second level metamodel of communication theory would help to understand the differences between first level communication traditions. With this thesis in place, Craig proposes seven suggested traditions of communication that have emerged and each of which have their own way of understanding communication.

1. Rhetorical: views communication as the practical art of discourse.
2. Semiotic: views communication as the mediation by signs.
3. Phenomenological: communication is the experience of dialogue with others.
4. Cybernetic: communication is the flow of information.
5. Socio-psychological: communication is the interaction of individuals.
6. Socio-cultural: communication is the production and reproduction of the social order.
7. Critical: communication is the process in which all assumptions can be challenged.

These proposed seven traditions of communication theory are then placed on two separate tables first to show how each traditions different interpretation of communication defines the tradition's vocabulary, communication problems, and commonplaces, and next to show what argumentation between the traditions would look like. Craig then outlines the specifics of each tradition.

=== Conclusion ===
Craig concluded with an open invitation to explore how the differences in these theories might shed light on key issues, show where new traditions could be created, and engaging communication theory with communication problems through metadiscourse. Craig further proposes several future traditions that could possibly be fit into the metamodel. A feminist tradition where communication is theorized as "connectedness to others", an aesthetic tradition theorizing communication as "embodied performance", an economic tradition theorizing communication as "exchange", and a spiritual tradition theorizing communication on a "nonmaterial or mystical plane of existence."

== Response ==
=== Myers, constitutive metamodel, and truth ===
In 2001 Myers, a computer-mediated communication scholar from Loyola University New Orleans, criticizes Craig's ideas in "A Pox on All Compromises: A reply to Craig (1999)." Myers makes two main arguments against Craig's article. Myers argues that Craig misrepresents the metamodel, and that the lack of any critical truth within Craigs construction is problematic for the field of communication theory. The metamodel is misrepresented by unjustly arguing that there is a separation between first and second level constitutive models while hiding the paradox within this statement, and that it privileges the constitutive model rather than another theoretical conception. Next Myers argues that Craig fails to draw any way to discern truth within the theories. Using a case study regarding the rise and fall of technological determinism among computer-mediated communication scholars, Myers argues that a metamodel needs to provide some mechanism that will "reduce misrepresentation and mistake" in evaluating theory. Myers frames Craig's ideas of collective discourse without an evaluative criteria of what is good theory and bad theory as "a Mad Hatter's tea party" which will "allow all to participate in this party of discourse" but will not be able to "inform any of the participants when it is time to leave."

==== Craig's response to Myers ====
Craig responded, in "an almost Jamesian reply", that Myers criticisms were not founded in actual inconsistencies within Craigs argument. Rather they were founded in the difference between Myers and Craig's "respective notions of truth and the proper role of empirical truth as a criterion for adjudicating among theories." In regard to Myers first claim that the separation between first level theories and second level metatheory is paradoxical and therefore an inaccurate or misguided distinction, Craig admits that there is a paradox inherent within a separation between first order theories and metatheory but "slippage between logical levels is an inherent feature (or bug) of communication, and we should not forget that theory is, among other things, communication. " Craig cites Gregory Bateson as pointing out that while the theory of logical types forbids the mixing of different "levels" to avoid paradox, "practical communication necessarily does exactly that." Actual communication is fraught with paradox, and while a logicians ideal would have us try and resolve these paradoxes, in actual practice we don't because there is no way to do so. In actually occurring communication people employ different means of dealing with this paradox, but resolving the paradox is not a possible solution. Craig argues that Myers has been unable to prove any inconsistency or misrepresentation when it came to using the constitutive model for his metamodel. Rather than trying to subvert every other theory to a constitutional model, Craig used the constitutive model not for some theory of truth or logical necessity, but because the constitutive model pragmatically will accomplish the goal of the project, that of opening up a space from which competing theories of communication can interact. With this the constitutional model will be able to maintain a theoretical cosmopolitanism.

On the second argument that the metamodel lacks any empirical truth criteria, Craig argues that not only did Myers miss the point of the metamodel by claiming it should evaluate the truth of theories but that Myers own case study fails to back up his point. The metamodel itself does not distinguish the falseness of other models. However, contrary to Myers claim, the metamodel does allow theorists engaged in discussion to judge the validity of theories "on the basis of empirical evidence in ordinary reasonable ways." What the metamodel does deny is a universally established absolute truth in the field of communication theory. Craig points out that Myers was correct in that the metamodel is ill-equipped to judge theories as valid or invalid, it also doesn't do a good job of closing "the Antarctic ozone hole or solve other problems for which it was not designed." The case study that Myers presents is the debate about technological determinism in the realm of Computer Mediated Communication. Craig points out that this debate occurred between social scientific researchers. This type of research has a shared commitment to empirical research methods. So in spite of already possessing a shared truth criteria, these researchers failed to prevent errors Myers hopes would be avoided by holding onto a form of absolute truth. This case study would be a good critique of empirical truth but "how it supports a critique of the constitutive metamodel is less than apparent." By relying upon this case study Myers sabotages his argument for establishing an absolute truth criteria, demonstrating that "we would gain little by holding on to such a criterion."

=== Russill, pragmatism as an eighth tradition ===
After this exchange between Myers and Craig, there was no real disciplinary discussion of the metamodel besides textbooks which used the metamodel as a framework for introducing the field. Then in 2004 in an unpublished dissertation, which was mentioned in a footnote in his 2005 "The road not Taken: William James's Radical Empiricism and Communication Theory," Russill proposed the possibly of pragmatism as an eighth tradition of communication studies. This was attempted by using "Craig's rules" for the requirements of a tradition in communication theory which Russill formulates as "a problem formulation..., an initial vocabulary..., and arguments for the plausibility of this viewpoint in relation to prevailing traditions of theory."

Russill did not write his dissertation with the goal of constructing a tradition of communication theory, rather he was attempting to "resuscitate and reconstruct Dewey's theory of the public as a pragmatist theory of democratic communication." To accomplish this goal Russill places Dewey in conversation with a variety of theorists including William James, John Locke, James Carey, Michel Foucault, Jürgen Habermas, and Walter Lippmann among others. Russill makes the argument that the pragmatist tradition "conceptualizes communication in response to the problem of incommensurability." Incommensurability being how a pluralistic society can engage in cooperation when there is an absence "of common, absolute standards for resolving differences." Russill briefly attempted to construct a pragmatist tradition of communication only to establish Dewey's theory of the public within that tradition. To do this he outlines pragmatism as a tradition that identifies the problem formulation as "incommensurability", and the vocabulary as "democracy, publics, power, criticism, response-ability, triple contingency."

==== Craig's response to Russill ====
Craig responds to this in "Pragmatism in the Field of Communication Theory" and mentions that while Russill "does not entirely follow 'Craig's Rules'" for a new tradition of communication theory, Russill "does define a pragmatist tradition in terms of a distinct way of framing the problem of communication and articulates premises that make the tradition theoretically and practically plausible." Craig points out that Russill is not the first communication theorists who writes on pragmatism, however he is the first to use the constitutive metamodel to define it as a tradition of communication. This conception of pragmatism as an eighth tradition of communication studies allows a new space for theories, which Craig identified as either ambiguously placed or neglected, to "immediately snap into focus as contributors to a distinct [pragmatic] tradition."

To fully outline a new tradition of communication theory, Russill would have had to fully incorporate that tradition within the dialogical-dialectical matrix. Russill failed to fully consider the full range of criticism which would occur between the Pragmatist tradition and the other traditions of communication. Craig uses the dialogical-dialectical matrix to outline how pragmatism could be incorporated into the metamodel.

== See also ==
- Meta-ethics
- Metaphilosophy
