= Communication theory =

Proposed description of communication phenomena

Communication theory is a proposed description of communication phenomena, the relationships among them, a storyline describing these relationships, and an argument for these three elements. Communication theory provides a way of talking about and analyzing key events, processes, and commitments that together form communication. Theory can be seen as a way to map the world and make it navigable; communication theory gives us tools to answer empirical, conceptual, or practical communication questions.

Communication is defined in both commonsense and specialized ways. Communication theory emphasizes its symbolic and social process aspects as seen from two perspectives—as exchange of information (the transmission perspective), and as work done to connect and thus enable that exchange (the ritual perspective).

Sociolinguistic research in the 1950s and 1960s demonstrated that the level to which people change their formality of their language depends on the social context that they are in. This had been explained in terms of social norms that dictated language use. The way that we use language differs from person to person.

Communication theories have emerged from multiple historical points of origin, including classical traditions of oratory and rhetoric, Enlightenment-era conceptions of society and the mind, and post-World War II efforts to understand propaganda and relationships between media and society. Prominent historical and modern foundational communication theorists include Kurt Lewin, Harold Lasswell, Paul Lazarsfeld, Carl Hovland, James Carey, Elihu Katz, Kenneth Burke, John Dewey, Jurgen Habermas, Marshall McLuhan, Theodor Adorno, Antonio Gramsci, Jean-Luc Nancy, Robert E. Park, George Herbert Mead, Joseph Walther, Claude Shannon, Stuart Hall and Harold Innis—although some of these theorists may not explicitly associate themselves with communication as a discipline or field of study.

== Models and elements ==
One key activity in communication theory is the development of models and concepts used to describe communication. In the Linear Model, communication works in one direction: a sender encodes some message and sends it through a channel for a receiver to decode. In comparison, the Interactional Model of communication is bidirectional. People send and receive messages in a cooperative fashion as they continuously encode and decode information. The Transactional Model assumes that information is sent and received simultaneously through a noisy channel, and further considers a frame of reference or experience each person brings to the interaction.

Some of the basic elements of communication studied in communication theory are:

- Source: Shannon calls this element the "information source", which "produces a message or sequence of messages to be communicated to the receiving terminal."
- Sender: Shannon calls this element the "transmitter", which "operates on the message in some way to produce a signal suitable for transmission over the channel." In Aristotle, this element is the "speaker" (orator).
- Channel: For Shannon, the channel is "merely the medium used to transmit the signal from transmitter to receiver."
- Receiver: For Shannon, the receiver "performs the inverse operation of that done by the transmitter, reconstructing the message from the signal."
- Destination: For Shannon, the destination is "the person (or thing) for whom the message is intended".
- Message: from Latin mittere, "to send". The message is a concept, information, communication, or statement that is sent in a verbal, written, recorded, or visual form to the recipient.
- Feedback
- Entropic elements, positive and negative

== Epistemology ==
Communication theories vary substantially in their epistemology, and articulating this philosophical commitment is part of the theorizing process. Although the various epistemic positions used in communication theories can vary, one categorization scheme distinguishes among interpretive empirical, metric empirical or post-positivist, rhetorical, and critical epistemologies. Communication theories may also fall within or vary by distinct domains of interest, including information theory, rhetoric and speech, interpersonal communication, organizational communication, sociocultural communication, political communication, computer-mediated communication, and critical perspectives on media and communication.

=== Interpretive empirical epistemology ===
Interpretive empirical epistemology or interpretivism seeks to develop subjective insight and understanding of communication phenomena through the grounded study of local interactions. When developing or applying an interpretivist theory, the researcher themself is a vital instrument. Theories characteristic of this epistemology include structuration and symbolic interactionism, and frequently associated methods include discourse analysis and ethnography.

=== Metric empirical or post-positivist epistemology ===
A metric empirical or post-positivist epistemology takes an axiomatic and sometimes causal view of phenomena, developing evidence about association or making predictions, and using methods oriented to measurement of communication phenomena. Post-positivist theories are generally evaluated by their accuracy, consistency, fruitfulness, and parsimoniousness. Theories characteristic of a post-positivist epistemology may originate from a wide range of perspectives, including pragmatist, behaviorist, cognitivist, structuralist, or functionalist. Although post-positivist work may be qualitative or quantitative, statistical analysis is a common form of evidence and scholars taking this approach often seek to develop results that can be reproduced by others.

=== Rhetorical epistemology ===
A rhetorical epistemology lays out a formal, logical, and global view of phenomena with particular concern for persuasion through speech. A rhetorical epistemology often draws from Greco-Roman foundations such as the works of Aristotle and Cicero although recent work also draws from Michel Foucault, Kenneth Burke, Marxism, second-wave feminism, and cultural studies. Rhetoric has changed over time. Fields of rhetoric and composition have grown to become more interested in alternative types of rhetoric.

=== Critical epistemology ===
A critical epistemology is explicitly political and intentional with respect to its standpoint, articulating an ideology and criticizing phenomena with respect to this ideology. A critical epistemology is driven by its values and oriented to social and political change. Communication theories associated with this epistemology include deconstructionism, cultural Marxism, third-wave feminism, and resistance studies.

=== New modes of communication ===
During the mid-1970's, presiding paradigm had passed in regards to the development in communication. More specifically the increase in a participatory approach which challenged studies like diffusionism which had dominated the 1950s. There is no valid reason for studying people as an aggregation of specific individuals that have their social experience unified and cancelled out with the means of allowing only the attributes of socio-economic status, age and sex, representative of them except by assuming that the audience is a mass.

== By perspective or subdiscipline ==
Approaches to theory also vary by perspective or subdiscipline. The communication theory as a field model proposed by Robert Craig has been an influential approach to breaking down the field of communication theory into perspectives, each with its own strengths, weaknesses, and trade-offs.

=== Information theory ===
In information theory, communication theories examine the technical process of information exchange while typically using mathematics. This perspective on communication theory originated from the development of information theory in the early 1920s. Limited information-theoretic ideas had been developed at Bell Labs, all implicitly assuming events of equal probability. The history of information theory as a form of communication theory can be traced through a series of key papers during this time. Harry Nyquist's 1924 paper, Certain Factors Affecting Telegraph Speed, contains a theoretical section quantifying "intelligence" and the "line speed" at which it can be transmitted by a communication system. Ralph Hartley's 1928 paper, Transmission of Information, uses the word "information" as a measurable quantity, reflecting the receiver's ability to distinguish one sequence of symbols from any other. The natural unit of information was therefore the decimal digit, much later renamed the hartley in his honour as a unit or scale or measure of information. Alan Turing in 1940 used similar ideas as part of the statistical analysis of the breaking of the German second world war Enigma ciphers. The main landmark event that opened the way to the development of the information theory form of communication theory was the publication of an article by Claude Shannon (1916–2001) in the Bell System Technical Journal in July and October 1948 under the title "A Mathematical Theory of Communication". Shannon focused on the problem of how best to encode the information that a sender wants to transmit. He also used tools in probability theory, developed by Norbert Wiener.

They marked the nascent stages of applied communication theory at that time. Shannon developed information entropy as a measure for the uncertainty in a message while essentially inventing the field of information theory. "The fundamental problem of communication is that of reproducing at one point either exactly or approximately a message selected at another point." In 1949, in a declassified version of Shannon's wartime work on the mathematical theory of cryptography ("Communication Theory of Secrecy Systems"), he proved that all theoretically unbreakable ciphers must have the same requirements as the one-time pad. He is also credited with the introduction of sampling theory, which is concerned with representing a continuous-time signal from a (uniform) discrete set of samples. This theory was essential in enabling telecommunications to move from analog to digital transmissions systems in the 1960s and later. In 1951, Shannon made his fundamental contribution to natural language processing and computational linguistics with his article "Prediction and Entropy of Printed English" (1951), providing a clear quantifiable link between cultural practice and probabilistic cognition.

=== Interpersonal communication ===
Theories in interpersonal communication are concerned with the ways in which very small groups of people communicate with one another. It also provides the framework in which we view the world around us. Although interpersonal communication theories have their origin in mass communication studies of attitude and response to messages, since the 1970s, interpersonal communication theories have taken on a distinctly personal focus. Interpersonal theories examine relationships and their development, non-verbal communication, how we adapt to one another during conversation, how we develop the messages we seek to convey, and how deception works.

=== Organizational communication ===
Organizational communication theories address not only the ways in which people use communication in organizations, but also how they use communication to constitute that organization, developing structures, relationships, and practices to achieve their goals. Although early organization communication theories were characterized by a so-called container model (the idea that an organization is a clearly bounded object inside which communication happens in a straightforward manner following hierarchical lines), more recent theories have viewed the organization as a more fluid entity with fuzzy boundaries. Studies within the field of organizational communication mention communication as a facilitating act and a precursor to organizational activity as cooperative systems.

Given that its object of study is the organization, it is perhaps not surprising that organization communication scholarship has important connections to theories of management, with Management Communication Quarterly serving as a key venue for disseminating scholarly work. However, theories in organizational communication retain a distinct identity through their critical perspective toward power and attention to the needs and interests of workers, rather than privileging the will of management.

Organizational communication can be distinguished by its orientation to four key problematics: voice (who can speak within an organization), rationality (how decisions are made and whose ends are served), organization (how is the organization itself structured and how does it function), and the organization-society relationship (how the organization may alternately serve, exploit, and reflect society as a whole).

=== Sociocultural communication ===
This line of theory examines how social order is both produced and reproduced through communication. Communication problems in the sociocultural tradition may be theorized in terms of misalignment, conflict, or coordination failure. Theories in this domain explore dynamics such as micro and macro level phenomena, structure versus agency, the local versus the global, and communication problems which emerge due to gaps of space and time, sharing some kinship with sociological and anthropological perspectives but distinguished by keen attention to communication as constructed and constitutive.

=== Political communication ===
Political communication theories are concerned with the public exchange of messages among political actors of all kinds. This scope is in contrast to theories of political science which look inside political institutions to understand decision-making processes. Early political communication theories examined the roles of mass communication (i.e. television and newspapers) and political parties on political discourse. However, as the conduct of political discourse has expanded, theories of political communication have likewise developed, to now include models of deliberation and sensemaking, and discourses about a wide range of political topics: the role of the media (e.g. as a gatekeeper, framer, and agenda-setter); forms of government (e.g. democracy, populism, and autocracy); social change (e.g. activism and protests); economic order (e.g. capitalism, neoliberalism and socialism); human values (e.g. rights, norms, freedom, and authority.); and propaganda, disinformation, and trust. Two of the important emerging areas for theorizing about political communication are the examination of civic engagement and international comparative work (given that much of political communication has been done in the United States).

=== Computer-mediated communication ===
Theories of computer-mediated communication or CMC emerged as a direct response to the rapid emergence of novel mediating communication technologies in the form of computers. CMC scholars inquire as to what may be lost and what may be gained when we shift many of our formerly unmediated and entrained practices (that is, activities that were necessarily conducted in a synchronized, ordered, dependent fashion) into mediated and disentrained modes. For example, a discussion that once required a meeting can now be an e-mail thread, an appointment confirmation that once involved a live phone call can now be a click on a text message, a collaborative writing project that once required an elaborate plan for drafting, circulating, and annotating can now take place in a shared document.

CMC theories fall into three categories: cues-filtered-out theories, experiential/perceptual theories, and adaptation to/exploitation of media. Cues-filtered-out theories have often treated face-to-face interaction as the gold standard against which mediated communication should be compared, and includes such theories as social presence theory, media richness theory, and the Social Identity model of Deindividuation Effects (SIDE). Experiential/perceptual theories are concerned with how individuals perceive the capacity of technologies, such as whether the technology creates psychological closeness (electronic propinquity theory). Adaptation/exploitation theories consider how people may creatively expand or make use of the limitations in CMC systems, including social information processing theory (SIP) and the idea of the hyperpersonal (when people make use of the limitations of the mediated channel to create a selective view of themselves with their communication partner, developing an impression that exceeds reality). Theoretical work from Joseph Walther has been highly influential in the development of CMC. Theories in this area often examine the limitations and capabilities of new technologies, taking up an 'affordances' perspective inquiring what the technology may "request, demand, encourage, discourage, refuse, and allow." Recently the theoretical and empirical focus of CMC has shifted more explicitly away from the 'C' (i.e. Computer) and toward the 'M' (i.e. Mediation).

=== Rhetoric and speech ===
Theories in rhetoric and speech are often concerned with discourse as an art, including practical consideration of the power of words and our ability to improve our skills through practice. Rhetorical theories provide a way of analyzing speeches when read in an exegetical manner (close, repeated reading to extract themes, metaphors, techniques, argument, meaning, etc.); for example with respect to their relationship to power or justice, or their persuasion, emotional appeal, or logic.

=== Critical perspectives on media and communication ===
Critical social theory in communication, while sharing some traditions with rhetoric, is explicitly oriented toward "articulating, questioning, and transcending presuppositions that are judged to be untrue, dishonest, or unjust."(p. 147) Some work bridges this distinction to form critical rhetoric. Critical theories have their roots in the Frankfurt School, which brought together anti-establishment thinkers alarmed by the rise of Nazism and propaganda, including the work of Max Horkheimer and Theodor Adorno. Modern critical perspectives often engage with emergent social movements such as post-colonialism and queer theory, seeking to be reflective and emancipatory. One of the influential bodies of theory in this area comes from the work of Stuart Hall, who questioned traditional assumptions about the monolithic functioning of mass communication with his Encoding/Decoding Model of Communication and offered significant expansions of theories of discourse, semiotics, and power through media criticism and explorations of linguistic codes and cultural identity.

== Axiology ==
Axiology is concerned with how values inform research and theory development. Most communication theory is guided by one of three axiological approaches. The first approach recognizes that values will influence theorists' interests but suggests that those values must be set aside once actual research begins. Outside replication of research findings is particularly important in this approach to prevent individual researchers' values from contaminating their findings and interpretations. The second approach rejects the idea that values can be eliminated from any stage of theory development. Within this approach, theorists do not try to divorce their values from inquiry. Instead, they remain mindful of their values so that they understand how those values contextualize, influence or skew their findings. The third approach not only rejects the idea that values can be separated from research and theory, but rejects the idea that they should be separated. This approach is often adopted by critical theorists who believe that the role of communication theory is to identify oppression and produce social change. In this axiological approach, theorists embrace their values and work to reproduce those values in their research and theory development.
