= Awareness of Dying =

1965 book by Barney Glaser

- Author: Barney Glaser; Anselm Strauss
- Language: English
- Genre: Non-fiction
- Publication date: 1965

Awareness of Dying is a 1965 book (ISBN 0-202-30763-8) by Barney Glaser and Anselm Strauss. In his 2007 article, sociologist Stefan Timmermans called the book "landmark".

== History and content ==
When Strauss came to the medical school of the University of California, San Francisco, he looked for an interesting subject that would also get the attention of medical people. Visiting hospitals, he discovered that dying was a highly problematic issue.

Strauss started field studies and six months later hired Glaser from Columbia University. Both researchers already had personal experience with the subject: Strauss had lost his mother and a friend in recent years, Glaser his father.

Strauss and Glaser suspected early on that the expectation of death by both the dying and the relatives were a key to understanding the interactions between those people. Their choice of hospitals and stations allowed them to compare various kinds of expectations. On a premature infant station, mortality was high but the patients were not aware of their impending deaths, while on an oncology station, dying was slow and differences in the awareness of dying were very pronounced. The typical situations were again different for emergency rooms and geriatrics or pediatrics departments.

Out of these field studies grew Awareness of Dying, a theory on the influence of awareness on the interaction with dying people. It differentiated between closed awareness, suspicion, mutual deception, and open awareness. The field studies had shown that the type of awareness had a significant impact on interaction — for instance, if patients were not aware of their dying, the nursing was often limited to the absolutely necessary in order to prevent open awareness.

== Significance ==
The book was the first application of grounded theory. Only two years later did Glaser and Strauss publish The Discovery of Grounded Theory, a book on the methodology they developed while working on Awareness of Dying.

== See also ==
- Awareness contexts
- Mortality salience
