= Grounded theory =

Qualitative research methodology

Grounded theory is a systematic methodology that has been largely applied to qualitative research conducted by social scientists. The methodology involves the construction of hypotheses and theories through the analysis of data and inductive reasoning. The methodology contrasts with the hypothetico-deductive model used in traditional scientific research.

A study based on grounded theory is likely to begin with a question, or even just with the collection of qualitative data. As researchers review the data collected, ideas or concepts become apparent to the researchers. These ideas/concepts are said to "emerge" from the data. The researchers tag those ideas/concepts with codes that succinctly summarize the ideas/concepts. As more data are collected and re-reviewed, codes can be grouped into higher-level concepts and then into categories. These categories become the basis of a hypothesis or a new theory. Thus, grounded theory is quite different from the traditional scientific model of research, where the researcher chooses an existing theoretical framework, develops one or more hypotheses derived from that framework, and only then collects data for the purpose of assessing the validity of the hypotheses.

== Background ==
Grounded theory is a general research methodology, a way of thinking about and conceptualizing data. It is used in studies of diverse populations from areas like remarriage after divorce and professional socialization. Grounded theory methods were developed by two sociologists, Barney Glaser and Anselm Strauss.

While collaborating on research on dying hospital patients, Glaser and Strauss developed the constant comparative method which later became known as the grounded theory method. They summarized their research in the book Awareness of Dying, which was published in 1965. Glaser and Strauss went on to describe their method in more detail in their 1967 book, The Discovery of Grounded Theory. The three aims of the book were to:

1. Provide a rationale to justify the idea that the gap between a social science theory and empirical data should be narrowed by firmly grounding a theory in empirical research;
2. Provide a logic for grounded theory;
3. Legitimize careful qualitative research, the most important goal, because, by the 1960s, quantitative research methods had gained so much prestige that qualitative research had come to be seen as inadequate.

A turning point in the acceptance of the theory came after the publication of Awareness of Dying. Their work on dying helped establish the influence of grounded theory in medical sociology, psychology, and psychiatry. From its beginnings, grounded theory methods have become more prominent in fields as diverse as drama, management, manufacturing, and education.

== Philosophical underpinnings ==
Grounded theory combines traditions in positivist philosophy, general sociology, and, particularly, the symbolic interactionist branch of sociology. According to Ralph, Birks and Chapman, grounded theory is "methodologically dynamic" in the sense that, rather than being a complete methodology, grounded theory provides a means of constructing methods to better understand situations humans find themselves in.

Glaser had a background in positivism, which helped him develop a system of labeling for the purpose of coding study participants' qualitative responses. He recognized the importance of systematic analysis for qualitative research. He thus helped ensure that grounded theory require the generation of codes, categories, and properties.

Strauss had a background in symbolic interactionism, a theory that aims to understand how people interact with each other in creating symbolic worlds and how an individual's symbolic world helps to shape a person's behavior. He viewed individuals as "active" participants in forming their own understanding of the world. Strauss underlined the richness of qualitative research in shedding light on social processes and the complexity of social life.

According to Glaser, the strategy of grounded theory is to interpret personal meaning in the context of social interaction. The grounded theory system studies "the interrelationship between meaning in the perception of the subjects and their action".

Grounded theory constructs symbolic codes based on categories emerging from recorded qualitative data. The idea is to allow grounded theory methods to help us better understand the phenomenal world of individuals. According to Milliken and Schreiber, another of the grounded theorist's tasks is to understand the socially-shared meanings that underlie individuals' behaviors and the reality of the participants being studied.

== Premise ==
Grounded theory provides methods for generating hypotheses from qualitative data. After hypotheses are generated, it is up to other researchers to attempt to sustain or reject those hypotheses. Questions asked by the qualitative researcher employing grounded theory include "What is going on?" and "What is the main problem of the participants, and how are they trying to solve it?"

Researchers using grounded theory methods do not aim for the "truth." Rather, those researchers try to conceptualize what has been taking place in the lives of study participants. When applying grounded theory methods, the researcher does not formulate hypotheses in advance of data collection as is often the case in traditional research, otherwise the hypotheses would be ungrounded in the data. Hypotheses are supposed to emerge from the data.

A goal of the researcher employing grounded theory methods is that of generating concepts that explain the way people resolve their central concerns regardless of time and place. These concepts organize the ground-level data. The concepts become the building blocks of hypotheses. The hypotheses become the constituents of a theory.

In most behavioral research endeavors, persons or patients are units of analysis, whereas in grounded theory the unit of analysis is the incident. Typically several hundred incidents are analyzed in a grounded theory study because every participant usually reports multiple incidents. When comparing multiple incidents in a certain area of study, the emerging concepts and their inter-relationships are paramount. Consequently, grounded theory is a general method that can use any kind of data although grounded theory is most commonly applied to qualitative data.

Most researchers oriented toward grounded theory do not apply statistical methods to the qualitative data they collect. The results of grounded theory research are not reported in terms of statistically significant findings although there may be probability statements about the relationship between concepts. Internal validity in its traditional research sense is not an issue in grounded theory. Rather, questions of fit, relevance, workability, and modifiability are more important in grounded theory. In addition, adherents of grounded theory emphasize a theoretical validity rather than traditional ideas of internal validity or measurement-related validity. Grounded theory adherents are "less charitable when discussing [psychometric] reliability, calling a single method of observation continually yielding an unvarying measurement a quixotic reliability."

A theory that is fitting has concepts that are closely connected to the incidents the theory purports to represent; fit depends on how thoroughly the constant comparison of incidents to concepts has been conducted. A qualitative study driven by grounded theory examines the genuine concerns of study participants; those concerns are not only of academic interest. Grounded theory works when it explains how study participants address the problem at hand and related problems. A theory is modifiable and can be altered when new relevant data are compared to existing data.

== Methodology ==
Stage	Purpose
Codes	Identifying anchors that allow the key points of the data to be gathered
Concepts	Collections of codes of similar content that allows the data to be grouped
Categories	Broad groups of similar concepts that are used to generate a theory
Theory	A collection of categories that detail the subject of the research

Once the data are collected, grounded theory analysis involves the following basic steps:

1. Coding text and theorizing: In grounded theory research, the search for a theory starts with the first line of the first interview that one codes. Small chunks of the text are coded line-by-line. Useful concepts are identified where key phrases are marked. The concepts are named. Another chunk of text is then taken and the above-mentioned steps are continued. According to Strauss and Corbin, this process is called open coding. The process involves analyzing data such that conceptual components emerge. The next step involves theorizing, which partly includes pulling concepts together and thinking through how each concept can be related to a larger more inclusive concept. The constant comparative method plays an important role here.
2. Memoing and theorizing: Memoing is the process by which a researcher writes running notes bearing on each of the concepts being identified. The running notes constitute an intermediate step between coding and the first draft of the completed analysis. Memos are field notes about the concepts and insights that emerge from the observations. Memoing starts with the first concept identified and continues right through the processing of all the concepts. Memoing contributes to theory building.
3. Integrating, refining and writing up theories: Once coding categories emerge, the next step is to link them together in a theoretical model constructed around a central category that holds the concepts together. The constant comparative method comes into play, along with negative case analysis. Negative case analysis refers to the researcher looking for cases that are inconsistent with the theoretical model.

Theorizing is involved in all these steps. One is required to build and test theory all the way through till the end of a project.

The idea that all is data is a fundamental property of grounded theory. The idea means that everything that the researcher encounters when studying a certain area is data, including not only interviews or observations but anything that helps the researcher generate concepts for the emerging theory. According to Ralph, Birks, and Chapman field notes can come from informal interviews, lectures, seminars, expert group meetings, newspaper articles, Internet mail lists, even television shows, conversations with friends etc.

=== Coding ===
Coding places incidents into categories and then creates one or more hierarchies out of these categories in terms of categories and subcategories or properties of a categories. A property might be on a continuum such as from low to high, this may be referred to as a dimension. (Note: See the section: "The emergence of categories and their properties from the data" in: "It becomes possible to differentiate incidents in the data or text passages classified as dealing with social loss according to the subcategory ‘degree of social loss’ by forming further subcategories ‘high social loss,’ ‘medium social loss,’ and ‘low social loss.’ The whole range or set of these three subcategories then represents a theoretical property of the category social loss.") Constant comparison where categories are continually compared to one another is used to create both subcategories and properties. (Note: "The purpose of constant comparison is to see if the data support and continue to support merging categories. At the same time, the process further builds and substantiates the emerging categories by defining their properties and dimensions") There is some variation in the meanings of the terms code, concept and category with some authors viewing a code as identical to category while others consider a concept to be more abstract than a code, which a code being more like a substantive code. (Note: See the section "Codes, categories, concepts" of) Different researchers have identified different types of codes and encourage different methods of coding, with Strauss and Glaser both going on to extend their work with different forms of coding.

The core variable explains most of the participants' main concern with as much variation as possible. It has the most powerful properties to picture what's going on, but with as few properties as possible needed to do so. A popular type of core variable can be theoretically modeled as a basic social process that accounts for most of the variation in change over time, context, and behavior in the studied area. "grounded theory is multivariate. It happens sequentially, subsequently, simultaneously, serendipitously, and scheduled" (Glaser, 1998).

Open coding or substantive coding is conceptualizing on the first level of abstraction. Written data from field notes or transcripts are conceptualized line by line. In the beginning of a study everything is coded in order to find out about the problem and how it is being resolved. The coding is often done in the margin of the field notes. This phase is often tedious since it involves conceptualizing all the incidents in the data, which yields a number of concepts. These are compared as more data is coded, merged into new concepts, and eventually renamed and modified. The grounded theory researcher goes back and forth while comparing data, constantly modifying, and sharpening the growing theory at the same time they follow the build-up schedule of grounded theory's different steps.

Strauss and Corbin proposed axial coding and defined it in 1990 as "a set of procedures whereby data are put back together in new ways after open coding, by making connections between categories." Glaser proposed a similar concept called theoretical coding. Theoretical codes help to develop an integrated theory by weaving fractured concepts into hypotheses that work together. The theory, of which the just-mentioned hypotheses are constituents, explains the main concern of the participants. It is, however, important that the theory is not forced on the data beforehand but is allowed to emerge during the comparative process of grounded theory. Theoretical codes, like substantive codes, should emerge from the process of constantly comparing the data in field notes and memos.

Selective coding is conducted after the researcher has found the core variable or what is thought to be the tentative core. The core explains the behavior of the participants in addressing their main concern. It just more or less fits with the data. After the core variable is chosen, researchers selectively code data with the core guiding their coding, not bothering about concepts of little relevance to the core and its sub-cores. In addition, the researcher now selectively samples new data with the core in mind, a process that is called theoretical sampling – a deductive component of grounded theory. Selective coding delimits the scope of the study (Glaser, 1998). Grounded theory is less concerned with data accuracy than with generating concepts that are abstract and general. Selective coding could be conducted by reviewing old field notes and/or memos that have already been coded once at an earlier stage or by coding newly gathered data.

Strauss and Corbin proposed a "coding paradigm" that involved "conditions, context, action/interactional strategies and consequences."

=== Memoing ===
Theoretical memoing is "the core stage of grounded theory methodology" (Glaser 1998). "Memos are the theorizing write-up of ideas about substantive codes and their theoretically coded relationships as they emerge during coding, collecting and analyzing data, and during memoing" (Glaser 1998).

Memoing is also important in the early phase of a grounded theory study (e.g., during open coding). In memoing, the researcher conceptualizes incidents, helping the process along. Theoretical memos can be anything written or drawn in the context of the constant comparative method, an important component of grounded theory. Memos are important tools to both refine and keep track of ideas that develop when researchers compare incidents to incidents and then concepts to concepts in the evolving theory. In memos, investigators develop ideas about naming concepts and relating them to each other. They examine relationships between concepts with the help of fourfold tables, diagrams, figures, or other means generating comparative power.

Without memoing, the theory is superficial and the concepts generated are not very original. Memoing works as an accumulation of written ideas into a bank of ideas about concepts and how they relate to each other. This bank contains rich parts of what will later be the written theory. Memoing is total creative freedom without rules of writing, grammar or style (Glaser 1998). The writing must be an instrument for outflow of ideas, and nothing else. When people write memos, the ideas become more realistic, being converted from thoughts into words, and thus ideas communicable to the afterworld.

In grounded theory the preconscious processing that occurs when coding and comparing is recognized. The researcher is encouraged to register ideas about the ongoing study that eventually pop up in everyday situations, and awareness of the serendipity of the method is also necessary to achieve good results.

=== Serendipity pattern ===
Building on the work of sociologist Robert K. Merton, his idea of serendipity patterns has come to be applied in grounded theory research. Serendipity patterns refer to fairly common experiences when observing the world. Serendipity patterns include unanticipated and anomalous events. These patterns can become the impetus for the development of a new theory or the extension of an existing theory. Merton also coauthored (with Elinor Barber) The Travels and Adventures of Serendipity, which traces the origins and uses of the word "serendipity" since it was coined. The book is "a study in sociological semantics and the sociology of science," as the subtitle declares. Merton and Barber further develop the idea of serendipity as scientific "method," as contrasted with purposeful discovery by experiment or retrospective prophecy.

=== Sorting ===
In the next step memos are sorted, which is the key to formulating a theory that could be clearly presented to others. Sorting puts fractured data back together. During sorting new ideas can emerge. The new ideas can, in turn, be recorded in new memos, giving rise to the memo-on-memos phenomenon. Sorting memos can help generate theory that explains the main action in the studied area. A theory written from unsorted memos may be rich in ideas but the connections among concepts are likely to be weak.

=== Writing ===
Writing up the sorted memos follows the sorting process. At this stage, a written theory takes shape. The different categories are now related to each other and the core variable. The theory should encompass the important emergent concepts and their careful description. The researcher may also construct tables and/or figures to optimize readability.

In a later rewriting stage, the relevant scholarly literature is woven into the theory. Finally, the theory is edited for style and language. Eventually, the researcher submits the resulting scholarly paper for publication. Most books on grounded theory do not explain what methodological details should be included in a scholarly article; however, some guidelines have been suggested.

=== No pre-research literature review and no talk ===
Grounded theory gives the researcher freedom to generate new concepts in explaining human behavior. Research based on grounded theory, however, follows a number of rules. These rules make grounded theory different from most other methods employed in qualitative research.

No pre-research literature review. Reviewing the literature of the area under study is thought to generate preconceptions about what to find. The researcher is said to become sensitized to concepts in the extant literature. According to grounded theory, theoretical concepts should emerge from the data unsullied by what has come before. The literature should only be read at the sorting stage and be treated as more data to code and compared with what has already been coded and generated.

No talk. Talking about the theory before it is written up drains the researcher of motivational energy. Talking can either render praise or criticism. Both can diminish the motivational drive to write memos that develop and refine the concepts and the theory. Positive feedback, according to Glaser, can make researchers content with what they have and negative feedback hampers their self-confidence. Talking about the grounded theory should be restricted to persons capable of helping the researcher without influencing their final judgments.

== Use of preexisting theory ==
Different approaches to grounded theory reflect different views on how preexisting theory should be used in research. In The Discovery of Grounded Theory, Glaser and Strauss advanced the view that, prior to conducting research, investigators should come to an area of study without any preconceived ideas regarding relevant concepts and hypotheses. In this way, the investigator, according to Glaser and Strauss, avoids imposing preconceived categories upon the research endeavor.

Glaser later attempted to address the tension between not reading and reading the literature before a qualitative study begins. Glaser raised the issue of the use of a literature review to enhance the researchers' "theoretical sensitivity," i.e., their ability to identify a grounded theory that is a good fit to the data. He suggested that novice researchers might delay reading the literature to avoid undue influence on their handling of the qualitative data they collect. Glaser believed that reading the relevant research literature (substantive literature) could lead investigators to apply preexisting concepts to the data, rather than interpret concepts emerging from the data. He, however, encouraged a broad reading of the literature to develop theoretical sensitivity. Strauss felt that reading relevant material could enhance the researcher's theoretical sensitivity.

== Split in methodology and methods ==
There has been some divergence in the methodology of grounded theory. Over time, Glaser and Strauss came to disagree about methodology and other qualitative researchers have also modified ideas linked to grounded theory. This divergence occurred most obviously after Strauss published Qualitative Analysis for Social Scientists (1987). In 1990, Strauss, together with Juliet Corbin, published Basics of Qualitative Research: Grounded Theory Procedures and Techniques. The publication of the book was followed by a rebuke by Glaser (1992), who set out, chapter by chapter, to highlight the differences in what he argued was the original grounded theory and why what Strauss and Corbin had written was not grounded theory in its "intended form." This divergence in methodology is a subject of much academic debate, which Glaser (1998) calls a "rhetorical wrestle". Glaser continues to write about and teach the original grounded theory method.

Grounded theory methods, according to Glaser, emphasize induction or emergence, and the individual researcher's creativity within a clear stagelike framework. By contrast, Strauss has been more interested in validation criteria and a systematic approach. According to Kelle (2005), "the controversy between Glaser and Strauss boils down to the question of whether the researcher uses a well-defined "coding paradigm" and always looks systematically for "causal conditions," "phenomena/context, intervening conditions, action strategies," and "consequences" in the data (Straussian), or whether theoretical codes are employed as they emerge in the same way as substantive codes emerge, but drawing on a huge fund of "coding families" (Glaserian).

=== Constructivist grounded theory ===
A later version of grounded theory called constructivist grounded theory, which is rooted in pragmatism and constructivist epistemology, assumes that neither data nor theories are discovered, but are constructed by researchers as a result of their interactions with the field and study participants. Proponents of this approach include Kathy Charmaz and Antony Bryant.

In an interview, Charmaz justified her approach as follows: "Grounded theory methodology had been under attack. The postmodern critique of qualitative research had weakened its legitimacy and narrative analysts criticized grounded theory methodology for fragmenting participants' stories. Hence, grounded theory methodology was beginning to be seen as a dated methodology and some researchers advocated abandoning it. I agreed with much of the epistemological critique of the early versions of grounded theory methodology by people like Kenneth Gergen. However, I had long thought that the strategies of grounded theory methodology, including coding, memo writing, and theoretical sampling were excellent methodological tools. I saw no reason to discard these tools and every reason to shift the epistemological grounds on which researchers used them."

Data are co-constructed by the researcher and study participants, and colored by the researcher's perspectives, values, privileges, positions, interactions, and geographical locations. This position takes a middle ground between the realist and postmodernist positions by assuming an "obdurate reality" at the same time as it assumes multiple perspectives on that reality. Within the framework of this approach, a literature review prior to data collection is used in a productive and data-sensitive way without forcing the conclusions contained in the review on the collected data.

=== Critical realist ===
More recently, a critical realist version of grounded theory has been developed and applied in research devoted to developing mechanism-based explanations for social phenomena. Critical realism (CR) is a philosophical approach associated with Roy Bhaskar, who argued for a structured and differentiated account of reality in which difference, stratification, and change are central. A critical realist grounded theory produces an explanation through an examination of the three domains of reality: the "real," as the domain of structures and mechanisms; the "actual," as the domain of events; and the "empirical," as the domain of experiences and perceptions. Critical Realist Grounded Theory (CRGT) builds on classic grounded theory by integrating the inductive approach to theory generation with the stratified reality of critical realism. Looker et al.'s work on this has developed the approach by adapting the principles of open coding, constant comparison and theoretical emergence to incorporate retroduction to identify underlying generative mechanisms. The methodological approach has been further developed into a grounded theory methodology of its own, with the book The Emergence of Critical Realist Grounded Theory: A Transformative Perspective, published by Routledge in 2026. The book guides readers through the methodological approach, offering a framework for generating explanatory theories which are grounded in empirical research and informed by a critical realist ontology.

== Use in various disciplines ==
Grounded theory has been "shaped by the desire to discover social and psychological processes." Grounded theory, however, is not restricted to these two areas study. As Gibbs points out, the process of grounded theory can be and has been applied to a number of different disciplines, including medicine, law, and economics. The reach of grounded theory has extended to nursing, business, and education.

Grounded theory focuses more on procedures than on the discipline to which grounded theory is applied. Rather than being limited to a particular discipline or form of data collection, grounded theory has been found useful across multiple research areas. Here are some examples:

1. In psychology, grounded theory is used to understand the role of therapeutic distance for adult clients with attachment anxiety.
2. In sociology, grounded theory is used to discover the meaning of spirituality in cancer patients, and how their beliefs influence their attitude towards cancer treatments.
3. Public health researchers have used grounded theory to examine nursing home preparedness needs in relation to Hurricane Katrina refugees sheltered in nursing homes.
4. In business, grounded theory is used by managers to explain the ways in which organizational characteristics explain co-worker support.
5. In software engineering, grounded theory has been used to study daily stand-up meetings.
6. Grounded theory has also helped researchers in the field of information technology to study the use of computer technology in older adults.
7. In nursing, grounded theory has been used to examine how change-of-shift reports can be used to keep patients safe. It was further developed in relation to students learning and working by Kath M. Melia.

== Benefits ==
The benefits of using grounded theory include ecological validity, the discovery of novel phenomena, and parsimony..

Ecological validity refers to the extent to which research findings accurately represent real-world settings. Research based on grounded theories are often thought to be ecologically valid because the research is especially close to the real-world participants. Although the constructs in a grounded theory are appropriately abstract (since their goal is to explain other similar phenomenon), they are context-specific, detailed, and tightly connected to the data.

Because grounded theories are not tied to any preexisting theory, grounded theories are often fresh and new and have the potential for novel discoveries in science and other areas.

Parsimony refers to a heuristic often used in science that suggests that when there are competing hypotheses that make the same prediction, the hypothesis that relies on the fewest assumptions is preferable. Grounded theories aim to provide practical and simple explanations of complex phenomena by attempting to link those phenomena to abstract constructs and hypothesizing relationships among those constructs.

Grounded theory has further significance because:

- It provides explicit, sequential guidelines for conducting qualitative research.
- It offers specific strategies for handling the analytic phases of inquiry.
- It provides ways to streamline and integrate data collection and analysis and
- It legitimizes qualitative research as scientific inquiry.

Grounded theory methods have earned their place as a standard social research methodology and have influenced researchers from varied disciplines and professions.

== Criticisms ==
Grounded theory has been criticized based on the scientific idea of what a theory is. Thomas and James, for example, distinguish the ideas of generalization, overgeneralization, and theory, noting that some scientific theories explain a broad range of phenomena succinctly, which grounded theory does not. Thomas and James observed that "The problems come when too much is claimed for [for a theory], simply because it is empirical; problems come in distinguishing generalization from over-generalization, narrative from induction." They also write that grounded theory advocates sometimes claim to find causal implications when in truth they only find an association.

There has been criticism of grounded theory on the grounds that it opens the door to letting too much researcher subjectivity enter. The authors just cited suggest that it is impossible to free oneself of preconceptions in the collection and analysis of data in the way that Glaser and Strauss assert is necessary. Popper also undermines grounded theory's idea that hypotheses arise from data unaffected by prior expectations. Popper wrote that "objects can be classified and can become similar or dissimilar, only in this way--by being related to needs and interests." Observation is always selective, based on past research and the investigators' goals and motives, and that preconceptionless research is impossible. Critics also note that grounded theory fails to mitigate participant reactivity and has the potential for an investigator steeped in grounded theory to over-identify with one or more study participants.

Although they suggest that one element of grounded theory worth keeping is the constant comparative method, Thomas and James point to the formulaic nature of grounded theory methods and the lack of congruence of those methods with open and creative interpretation, which ought to be the hallmark of qualitative inquiry.

The grounded theory approach can be criticized as being too empiricist, i.e., that it relies too heavily on the empirical data. Grounded theory considers fieldwork data as the source of theory. Thus the theories that emerge from a new fieldwork are set against the theories that preceded the fieldwork.

Strauss's version of grounded theory has been criticized in several other ways:

- Grounded theory researchers sometimes have a quasi-objective focus, emphasizing hypotheses, variables, reliability, and replicability. This multi-faceted focus leads to contradictory findings.
- It is inappropriate to ignore the existing theories by not paying attention to the literature.
- Grounded theory offers a complex methodology and confusing terminology rather than providing a practical orientation to research and data analysis. Also see Tolhurst.
- Some grounded theory researchers have produced poorly explained theories; concept generation rather than the generation of formal theory may be a more practical goal for grounded theory researchers.

Grounded theory was developed during an era when qualitative methods were often considered unscientific. But as the academic rigor of qualitative research became known, this type of research approach achieved wide acceptance. In American academia, qualitative research is often equated with grounded theory methods. Such equating of most qualitative methods with grounded theory has sometimes been criticized by qualitative researchers who take different approaches to methodology (for example, in traditional ethnography, narratology, and storytelling).

One alternative to grounded theory is engaged theory. Engaged theory equally emphasizes the conducting of on-the-ground empirical research but linking that research to analytical processes of empirical generalization. Unlike grounded theory, engaged theory derives from the tradition of critical theory. Engaged theory locates analytical processes within a larger theoretical framework that specifies different levels of abstraction, allowing investigators to make claims about the wider world.

Braun and Clarke regard thematic analysis as having fewer theoretical assumptions than grounded theory, and can be used within several theoretical frameworks. They write that in comparison to grounded theory, thematic analysis is freer because it is not linked to any preexisting framework for making sense of qualitative data. Braun and Clarke, however, concede that there is a degree of similarity between grounded theory and thematic analysis but prefer thematic analysis.

== See also ==
- Antipositivism
- Engaged theory
- Formal concept analysis
- Grounded practical theory
- Qualitative research
- Postpositivism
- Social research
- Content analysis
