= Axial coding =

Process during qualitative data analysis

Axial coding is the breaking down of core themes during qualitative data analysis.

Axial coding in grounded theory is the process of relating codes (categories and concepts) to each other, via a combination of inductive and deductive thinking. According to Strauss and Corbin (1990, 1998) who propose the use of a "coding paradigm", the basic framework of generic relationships is understood to include categories related to:

1. the phenomenon under study,
2. the conditions related to that phenomenon (context conditions, intervening structural conditions or causal conditions),
3. the actions and interactional strategies directed at managing or handling the phenomenon and
4. the consequences of the actions/interactions related to the phenomenon.

As Kelle underlines, the implicit or explicit theoretical framework necessary to identify categories in empirical data is derived, in the procedures explicated by Strauss and Corbin (1990), from a "general model of action rooted in pragmatist and interactionist social theory" (Kelle, 2005, para. 16). This model or theoretical framework underlines the importance of "analysing and modelling action and interaction strategies of the actors" (para. 16).

Axial coding is a cornerstone of Strauss and Corbin's (1990, 1998) approach but is regarded by Charmaz (2006) as highly structured and optional.

== See also ==
- Grounded theory
- Open coding
