= Barney Glaser =

American sociologist (1930–2022)

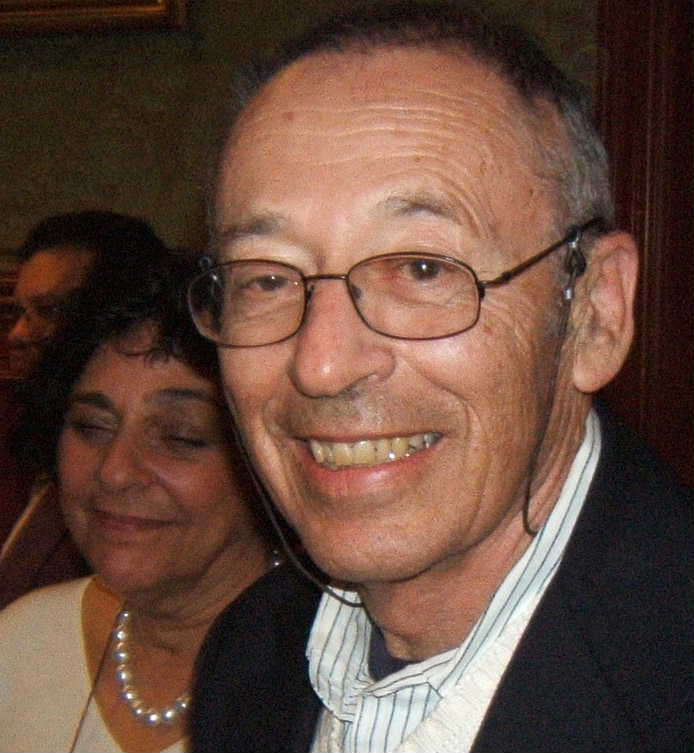
- Glaser and his wife Carolyn in 2005
- Born: Barney Galland Glaser; February 27, 1930; San Francisco, California, US
- Died: January 30, 2022 (aged 91); Mill Valley, California, U.S.
- Spouse: Carolyn Glaser

Academic background
- Education: Stanford University; Columbia University
- Thesis: Some Functions of Recognition in a Medical Research Organization (1961)
- Doctoral advisor: Robert K. Merton, Hans L. Zetterberg
- Influences: Paul Lazarsfeld

Academic work
- Discipline: Sociology
- Notable works: Awareness of Dying (1965); The Discovery of Grounded Theory (1967)
- Notable ideas: Grounded theory

Barney Galland Glaser (1930–2022) was an American sociologist and one of the founders of the grounded theory methodology.

Glaser was born on February 27, 1930, in San Francisco, California, and lived in nearby Mill Valley. He received his Bachelor of Arts degree at Stanford University in 1952. He pursued academic studies at the University of Paris where he studied contemporary literature. He also studied literature at University of Freiburg for two years during off-hours from his military service.

At Columbia University he was a student of Paul Lazarsfeld and Robert K. Merton and received a Doctor of Philosophy degree in 1961. The dissertation was published in the book Organizational Scientists: Their Professional Careers. Post-doc Glaser started a research collaboration with Anselm Strauss at the University of California, San Francisco. Together they wrote Awareness of Dying (1965) based on a study of dying in Californian hospitals. The book was a success. As a response to the many methodological questions on the dying study the first grounded theory (GT) methodology appeared in 1967 co-authored with Strauss: The Discovery of Grounded Theory.

In 1970 Glaser started the publishing company Sociology Press specializing in grounded theory methodologies and readers. The second grounded theory methodology was written by Glaser in 1978 (Theoretical Sensitivity). Thereafter, Glaser has published several readers of grounded theory and four more methodologies. He has traveled throughout the world giving workshops and seminars to many researchers. In 1998 Glaser received an honorary doctorate from Stockholm University.

In 1999 Glaser founded the non-profit web based organization Grounded Theory Institute. He owned Cascade Acceptance Corporation, which filed for bankruptcy in November 2009. In July 2010, the bankruptcy trustee declared that the company had been insolvent for at least two years, and the case was converted from a reorganization to a liquidation. Barney Glaser died at the age of 91 on January 30, 2022.
