= Anselm Strauss =

American sociologist (1916–1996)

- Born: Anselm Leonard Strauss; December 18, 1916; New York City, U.S.
- Died: September 5, 1996 (aged 79); San Francisco, California, U.S.
- Occupation: Sociologist

Anselm Leonard Strauss (December 18, 1916 – September 5, 1996) was an American sociologist who taught at the University of California, San Francisco.

He was internationally known as a medical sociologist (especially for his pioneering attention to chronic illness and dying) and as the developer (with Barney Glaser) of grounded theory, an innovative method of qualitative analysis widely used in sociology, nursing, education, social work, and organizational studies. He also wrote extensively on Chicago sociology/symbolic interactionism, sociology of work, social worlds/arenas theory, social psychology and urban imagery. He published over 30 books, chapters in over 30 other books, and over 70 journal articles.

== Biography ==
Strauss was born in New York City to Jewish immigrants in the United States and grew up in Mount Vernon, New York. His physician recommended that Strauss move to Arizona after high school because he suffered from bronchial problems. However, he moved to the University of Virginia in 1935, where he received his B.S. in biology in 1939. From there he went to the University of Chicago, where he received his M.A. in sociology (1942) and his Ph.D. in the same field (1945). It was also there where he studied symbolic interactionism under Herbert Blumer, but ultimately completed his doctoral dissertation under the supervision of Ernest Burgess.

During the years 1944 to 1947, Strauss was on the faculty of Lawrence College. From there he moved to Indiana University (1946–1952), where he met and collaborated with Alfred Lindesmith; in 1949, they published their very influential book, Social Psychology. That volume was translated into Swedish, German, and Japanese and the eighth edition in English was published in 1999.

In 1952, Strauss returned to the University of Chicago as an assistant professor. During that time, he worked with Prof. Everett Hughes, and became associated with a group of colleagues who would become known as the "Second Chicago School" (e.g., Howard S. Becker and Erving Goffman). In 1960, he went to the School of Nursing at the University of California, San Francisco where he founded the Department of Social and Behavioral Sciences. He chaired the department until 1987, although even as a professor emeritus he continued his research and teaching activities. During his time as chair, he was a consultant to the World Health Organization (WHO) in 1962 and 1970.

While at the University of California, San Francisco, Strauss and Barney Glaser originated grounded theory, which is widely used within qualitative research.

Strauss was elected Fellow of the American Association for the Advancement of Science in 1980. In that year he also received the Charles H. Cooley Award from the Society for the Study of Symbolic Interactionism. Between 1955 and 1980, he was an invited visiting professor at the universities of Frankfurt and Konstanz in Germany, Cambridge and Manchester in England, Paris in France, and Adelaide in Australia.

Strauss married Frances Cooperstein in 1940, they were married until his death. Jonathan Zucker is his nephew.

== Selected publications ==
- Grounded Theory in Practice (co-editor, 1997)
- Continual Permutations of Action (1993)
- Basics of Qualitative Research: Grounded Theory Procedures and Techniques (co-author, 1990. Translated into Korean, German, Chinese and Russian)
- Unending Work and Care: Managing Chronic Illness at Home (co-author, 1988. Translated into German)
- Qualitative Analysis for Social Scientists (1987. Translated into German and Chinese)
- Negotiations: Varieties, contexts, and social order (1978)
- Field Research: Strategies for a Natural Sociology (co-author, 1973. Translated into Japanese)
- The Discovery of Grounded Theory (co-author, 1967. Translated into Japanese)
- Awareness of Dying (co-author, 1965. Translated into Dutch, Polish and German)
- Psychiatric ideologies and institutions (1964)
- Mirrors and Masks: The Search for Identity (1959). Translated into German, Spanish, French, Portuguese, Polish and Italian
