= Cassandre software =

Software for computer assisted qualitative data analysis

Cassandre
- Developer: Christophe Lejeune
- Stable release: 3.18.01.31 / Jan 2018
- Written in: JavaScript on CouchDB
- Operating system: Microsoft Windows, Linux, macOS
- Type: Qualitative data analysis
- License: GNU Affero General Public License
- Website: www.cassandre.ulg.ac.be

Cassandre is a free and open source software for computer assisted qualitative data analysis and interpretation in humanities and social sciences. Although it refers, like other CAQDAS-software, to Grounded Theory Method, it also allows to conduct discourse analysis or quantitative content analysis. The software is designed as a server to support collaborative work. Formerly focused on semi-automatic coding, it now provides diaries assisting qualitative analysis.

In academia, Cassandre is used by social scientists in sociology, psychology, management, communication studies, education and political science. Some researchers also use it in computer science, namely in knowledge management, design, human-computer interaction and topic mapping. Many of the Cassandre users are academics and PhD students. The software tool is also used in public services (police and government departments) and in the industry (namely by Cockerill Maintenance & Ingénierie).

In 2010, in the so-called KWALON experiment, representatives of selected CAQDAS-Software were invited to analyze a dataset composed of newspapers articles and videos related to the 2008 financial crisis. The software packages Atlas.ti, MAXQDA, NVivo, Transana and Cassandre were taking part in the experiment. Commentators depicted Cassandre as the only software limited to text material and as an integrated approach between algorithms and hand-made coding. The experiment, however, suggested that the outcome of the analysis depended more of the analysis strategy than the software.

== Features ==
Its features include:

- Semi-automatic coding (through registers)
- Collaborative writing (through shared diaries)
- Participative research (through shared memos)
- Organizing memos
- Diagramming

== History ==
Christophe Lejeune created Cassandre's first version in 2006 after his post-doctoral stay in the University of Technology of Troyes where he involved in the Social Semantic Web team and participated the definition of the Hypertopic protocol. This protocol was used by Cassandre to exchange data with other software tool from the Hypertopic suite. As a server, Cassandre was storing texts and provided a semi-automated coding feature. Rather than highlighting excerpts (like in most of QDA software), the user highlights keywords or idioms (markers) that instantly match several excerpts of material. These markers are gathered in into registers, which represent analysis categories. Markers and registers are created, managed and browsed with Porphyry's Portfolio, a Hypertopic client developed in Java by Aurélien Bénel. Cassandre also provided meta-data and some lexical analysis (words counts) accessible through the Porphyry sidebar, a Firefox add-on.

Cassandre second version surfaced in 2010. Initially designed as PHP/SQL server (first MySQL then PostgreSQL), Cassandre was refactored as a CouchDB application. Lexical analysis was optimized and included in the per text view. Coding was integrated to the browser thanks to a Firefox add-on, LaSuli, developed by Chao Zhou.

Released in 2017, the third version of Cassandre consists in a in-depth refactoring. Resting on a typology of memos inspired by Grounded Theory Method, the application provides collaborative diaries aimed at structuring qualitative analyzes. Rather than coding, analysis is made through writing.

== See also ==
- Computer-assisted qualitative data analysis software
