= Aquad =

Software for qualitative data analysis

Aquad (Windows)
- Developer: Günter Huber
- Stable release: 8 / 2020
- Operating system: Microsoft Windows
- Type: Analysis of Qualitative Data Qualitative Research
- License: GPLv3
- Website: www.aquad.de

Aquad (an abbreviation of Analysis of Qualitative Data) is open source computer-assisted qualitative data analysis software (CAQDAS). It supports analysis of text, audio, video, and graphical data.

== Features ==
Aquad provides functions for content analysis, including:

- Text search: looking for segments in texts
- Classifying: labeling text, audio, image, and videosdata
- Writing memos (annotation): inserting annotations linked to parts or whole texts, audios, photos, or videos
- Word analysis: counting words according to criteria
- Retrieval by file name, code, keyword, or content: Retrieval of segments according to criteria
- Tabular analysis: constructing tables combining criteria and arranging data in rows and columns
- Construction of linkage hypotheses: looking for relationships across data
- Comparison of cases/files: contrasting coding across files
- Sequential analysis: objective hermeneutics
- Comparison of cases by Boolean analysis: critical features and identification of "types" as introduced by Charles Ragin.
- Export data: quantitative software as R, SPSS, and PSPP for statistical analysis.

=== Data context ===
Data can be directly analyzed on the screen (one-step) or outside (two-steps). One-step allows on-screen coding with digitized data. Two-steps allows the user to enter codes on the screen, keeping the documents on the desk or in other means such as cameras, TVs, etc. For instance, two-steps allows the analysis of recordings, diaries, incunabula, or objects without transcribing, taking photos, or scanning them.

=== Comparison of cases/files by Boolean analysis ===
Aquad allows comparison of cases/files by "logical minimization", by using its own algorithm and the R package qualitative comparative analysis to determine implicants.

== Versions ==
The latest available version is Aquad 8, which is available in German, English, and Spanish. Version 7 is also available for download.

== See also ==
- Case study
- Qualitative economics
- Qualitative marketing research
- Qualitative psychological research
- Qualitative research
