= KH Coder =

Qualitative data analysis software

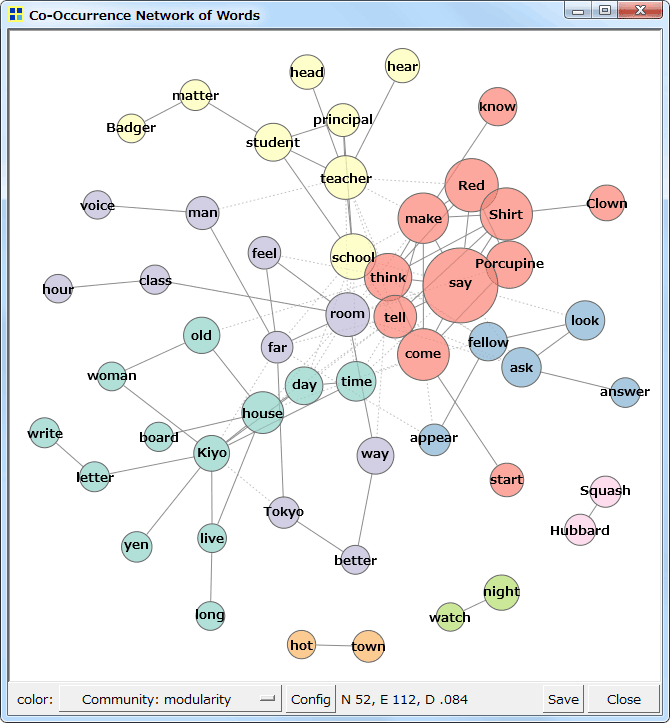
- Developer: Koichi Higuchi
- Stable release: 2.00f / Dec 2015
- Preview release: 3.Beta.01 / Mar 2020
- Repository: github.com/ko-ichi-h/khcoder
- Operating system: Microsoft Windows, Linux, macOS
- Type: Qualitative data analysis, Text mining, Content analysis
- License: GPL2 license
- Website: khcoder.net/en/

KH Coder is an open source software for computer assisted qualitative data analysis, particularly quantitative content analysis and text mining. It can be also used for computational linguistics. It supports processing and etymological information of text in several languages, such as Japanese, English, French, German, Italian, Portuguese and Spanish. Specifically, it can contribute factual examination co-event system hub structure, computerized arranging guide, multidimensional scaling and comparative calculations. Word frequency statistics, part-of-speech analysis, grouping, correlation analysis, and visualization (including histograms and clustering maps) are among the features offered by KH Coder.

It is well received by researchers worldwide and used in a large number of disciplines, including neuroscience, sociology, psychology, public health, media studies, education research and computer science. There are more than 500 English research papers listed in Google scholar. More than 3500 academic research papers were published that use KH Coder according to a list compiled by the author.

KH Coder has been reviewed as a user friendly tool "for identifying themes in large unstructured data sets, such as online reviews or open-ended customer feedback" and has been reviewed in comparison to WordStat.

== Features ==
Its features include:

- on word-level: Searching, KWIC concordance, collocation statistics, and correspondence analysis.
- on category-level: Development of categories or dictionaries, cross tabulation, and correspondence analysis.
- on word- and category-level: Frequency lists, multi-dimensional scaling, co-occurrence network, and hierarchical cluster analysis.
- on document-level: Searching, clustering, and Naive Bayes classifier

KH Coder allows for further search and statistical analysis functions using back-end tools such as Stanford POS Tagger, the natural language processing toolkit FreeLing, Snowball stemmer, MySQL and R.

== Alternatives ==
- qdap (Windows, Linux, macOS) for quantitative analysis of qualitative transcripts and natural language processing.

== See also ==
- Computer-assisted qualitative data analysis software
