= Center for Qualitative Psychology =

Psychologist researchers using qualitative methods

The Center for Qualitative Psychology was founded in October 1999 in the department of educational psychology at the University of Tübingen to promote qualitative research methods in psychology. The centre is also committed to supporting qualitative methods for social research in education, sociology, philosophy, medicine, ethnography, politics, etc.

Qualitative psychological research has developed a long experience from 1950 using open strategies as observation, introspection, narratives, discussion groups, interviews, etc. This kind of instruments allow to collect non structured data that need specific types of analysis as content analysis that is also supported on new computer means as CAQDAS (Computer assisted qualitative data analysis software).

== Purpose ==
As non-profit, the centre is oriented to develop a European network with an international perspective on qualitative research in psychology, and related fields as education, sociology, philosophy, medicine, ethnography, politics, etc. The centre supports all kind of scientific methodologies in Social Sciences, combining epistemological perspectives, strategies, and instruments to achieve the best, rigorous knowledge to improve people life all around the world independently of their gender, age, social level, culture, believes, nationality, and religion.

== Annual meetings ==
Every year, the centre organizes a workshop about a specific topic and in a different place:

- 2000: Qualitative Research in Psychology, in Blaubeuren, Germany.
- 2001: The role of the researcher in qualitative psychology, in Blaubeuren, Germany.
- 2002: Research Questions and Matching Methods of Analysis, in Perlora, Spain.
- 2003: Research Design, in Blaubeuren, Germany.
- 2004: Questions on generalization, in Austria.
- 2006: Qualitative and Quantitative Approaches to Learning and Instruction, Riga, Latvia.
- 2007: Importance of qualitative approaches in psychology, in Erkner/Berlin, Germany.
- 2008: Epistemology and epistemological approaches, in Oulu, Finland.
- 2009: Beyond text: Video and other medium use in qualitative research, in Weingarten, Germany.
- 2010: The values in qualitative research, in Sassari, Italy.
- 2011: Qualitative Research in Attention to Diversity, in Heidelberg, Germany.
- 2012: Building bridges, in Israel at the Achva Academic College of Education.
- 2013: Conflicts in qualitative research, in Jaén (Spain) at the University of Jaén.
- 2014: How to publish and disseminate qualitative research, in Weingarten (Germany) at the University of Weingarten.
- 2015: Workshop at La Laguna (Tenerife, Spain) with the topic "Reflections on methods of qualitative research".
- 2016: Conflicts in qualitative research, in Jaén (Spain) at the University of Jaén with the topic "Qualitative approaches to actual problems in Education".
- 2018: Workshop at the Karlsruhe University of Education, Germany.
- 2021: Next workshop at Melilla Campus of the University of Granada, Spain.

== Publications ==
The centre publishes proceedings with the main contributions presented at the annual meeting. All published workshop are available at the PsyDok (Volltextserver der Virtuellen Fachbibliothek Psychologie).

== See also ==
- Qualitative psychological research
- Qualitative research
- Qualitative methods
- Psychology
- Observation
- Introspection
- Narratives
- Discussion groups
- Interviews
- Computer assisted qualitative data analysis software
