= Incompatibility thesis =

Incompatibility thesis is an argument in research methodology about incompatibility of quantitative research and qualitative research paradigms in the same research. This thesis is based on philosophies of post-structuralism and post-modernism (among others). Arguments from those philosophies support exclusive superiority of one orientation (usually, the qualitative one) are oppose mixing it with quantitative research (as is advocated by the proponents of mixed-method research who support the compatibility thesis).

== Information ==
Incompatibilists maintain that problems arise not so much at the level of practice, but at the level of epistemological paradigms. In particular, they propose that quantitative and qualitative methods are incompatible on an epistemological level; therefore, the two kinds of methods are incompatible. HOWE 1998, argues that a principle implicit in the incompatibilist's argument ‘that abstract paradigms should determine research methods in a one-way fashion—is untenable’. That paradigms must demonstrate their worth in terms of how they inform, and are informed by, research methods that are successfully employed. Given such a two-way relationship between methods and paradigms, paradigms are evaluated in terms of how well they square with the demands of research practice and incompatibilism vanishes.
