= Coding Analysis Toolkit =

Web-based suite of CAQDAS tools

- Developer(s): Qualitative Data Analysis Program (University of Pittsburgh)
- Stable release: 2014-06-28 / 2009
- Repository: sourceforge.net/projects/catoolkit/
- Operating system: web-based
- Type: Qualitative data analysis, qualitative research
- License: GPLv3
- Website: cat.texifter.com

CAT or Coding Analysis Toolkit was a web-based suite of CAQDAS tools. It is free and open source software, and is developed by the Qualitative Data Analysis Program of the University of Pittsburgh. According to the CAT website, the tool was decommissioned on September 13, 2020.

CAT is able to import Atlas.ti data, but also has an internal coding module. It was designed to use keystrokes and automation as opposed to mouse clicks, to speed up CAQDAS tasks.

== See also ==
- Computer-assisted qualitative data analysis software
