= CATMA =

Online tool for annotating text

- Written in: Java
- Platform: Java
- License: GNU General Public License 3
- Website: catma.de
- Repository: github.com/forTEXT/catma

CATMA (Computer Assisted Text Markup and Analysis) is an online tool for annotating text that is frequently used in digital literary analysis and other digital textual scholarship in the humanities. It was developed by researchers at the University of Hamburg.

CATMA started in 2008 as a reimplementation of TACT (Textual Analysis Computing Tools), which was a DOS-based tool developed at University of Toronto. While other software packages for qualitative data analysis, like Dedoose or NVivo, are targeted at social science researchers, CATMA is explicitly designed for humanities research. It is frequently used for computational literary analysis, and has been discussed in a range of scholarly sources.
