= Provalis Research =

Canadian company

- Company type: Private
- Founded: Montreal
- Founder: Normand Peladeau
- Headquarters: Montreal, Quebec, Canada
- Area served: Worldwide
- Divisions: Software, Qualitative Data Analysis, Content Analysis, Text Mining
- Website: PROVALISRESEARCH.com

Provalis Research is a Canadian company that specializes in developing and marketing text analytics tools combining qualitative analysis through QDA Miner with quantitative content analysis and text-mining through WordStat. Headquartered in Montreal, the company was founded in 1989 by the current president Normand Peladeau.

Provalis Research software products are used by more than 6,000 institutions including universities, governments/NGOs and businesses.

== See also ==
- QDA Miner
- WordStat
- Computer assisted qualitative data analysis software
- Content analysis
- Text mining
