= Quirkos =

Software for qualitative data analysis

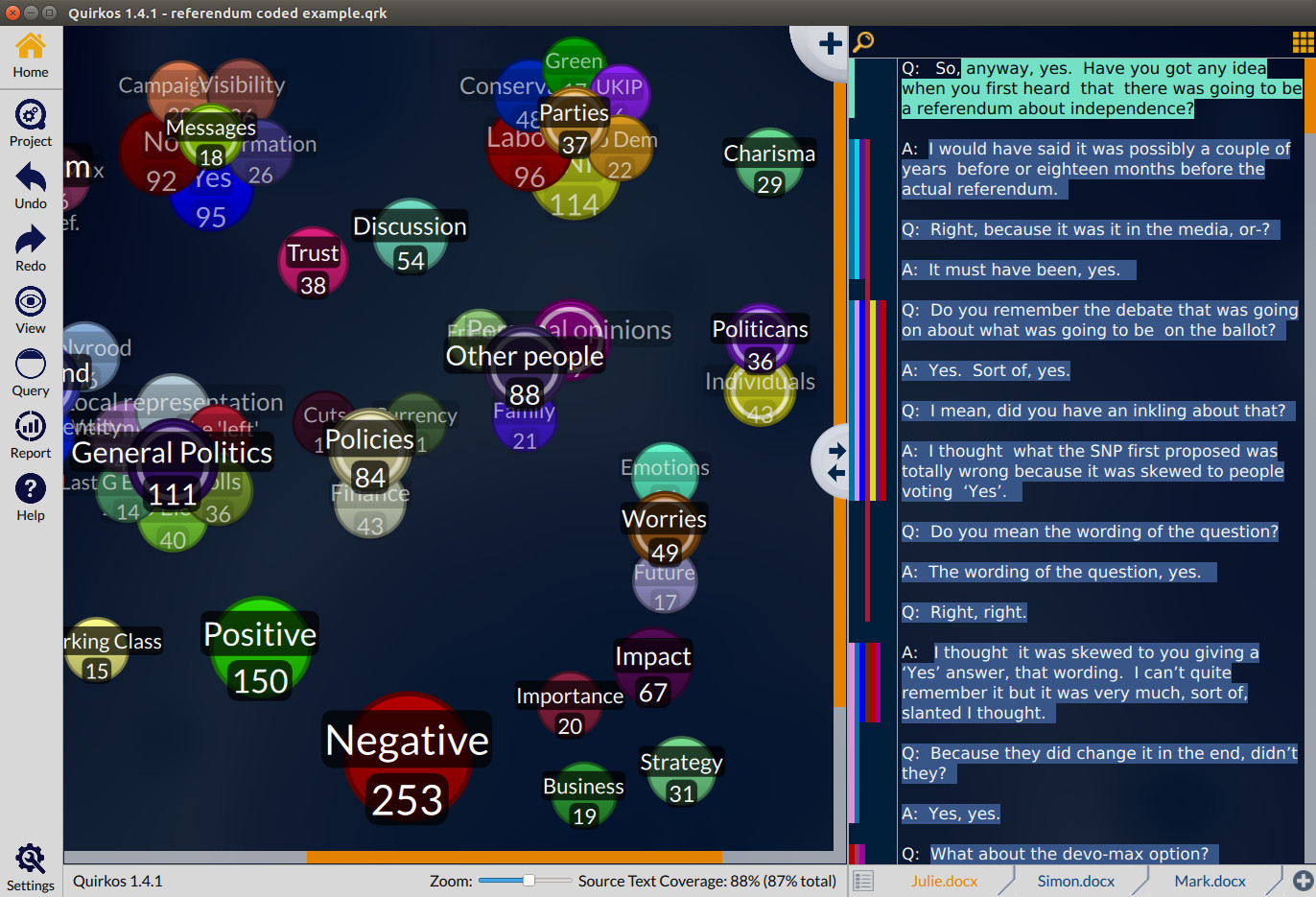
- Screenshot of Quirkos 1.4.1
- Developer(s): Quirkos Software
- Stable release: 3.0 / January 2025
- Operating system: Microsoft Windows, Linux, macOS, also browser based
- Type: Qualitative data analysis, Qualitative Research
- License: Proprietary
- Website: www.quirkos.com

Quirkos is a CAQDAS software package for the qualitative analysis of text data, commonly used in social science. It provides a graphical interface in which the nodes or themes of analysis are represented by bubbles. It is designed primarily for new and non-academic users of qualitative data, to allow them to quickly learn the basics of qualitative data analysis. Although simpler to use, it lacks some of the features present in other commercial CAQDAS packages such as multimedia support. However, it has been proposed as a useful tool for lay and participant led analysis and is comparatively affordable. It is developed by Edinburgh, UK based Quirkos Software, and was first released in October 2014.

The interface is unique, in that it simultaneously displays visualisations and text data and has identical capabilities on Windows, macOS and Linux. The thematic framework is represented with a series of circles, the size of each indicating the amount of data coded to them. Colors are used extensively to indicate the thematic bubble within the coding stripes on the text sources. There are few features for quantitative or statistical analysis of text data, however project files can be exported for analysis in statistical software such as SPSS or R.

Quirkos is extensively used in many different fields which utilise qualitative research, including sociology, health, media studies, school of education and human geography. The developers claim use in more than 100 universities across the world. It has also been used in research for non-governmental organisations such as the Infection Control Society and UNICEF. However, the text management capabilities also can be used to assist in systematic literature reviews.

== Features ==
- Basic features and simple operation
- Import of Microsoft Word, PDF, Text and RTF source files
- CSV import for tabulated data (such as online surveys)
- Integrated synonym database for keyword search
- Cluster analysis, wordclouds and visualisation of concurrent coding
- Export coded data to annotated Microsoft Word files
- Subset analysis by discrete and quantitative variables
- Cloud or local based data storage
- Live collaboration and team work on projects
- Quirkos also has a web-app version that works directly in the browser and an automated transcription service

== See also ==
- Computer-assisted qualitative data analysis software
