= QualCoder =

Software for qualitative data analysis

Qualcoder
- Developers: Colin Curtain, Kai Dröge, Justin Missaghieh--Poncet and Lorenzo Salomón Cárdenas
- Operating system: Linux, Windows and macOS
- Type: Qualitative data analysis
- License: GPLv3
- Website: qualcoder.org
- Repository: github.com/ccbogel/QualCoder

QualCoder is a free, open-source qualitative data analysis (QDA) computer software compatible with all major operating systems. It is currently being developed by Colin Curtain under the GNU General Public License. QualCoder is used in social sciences to manage and analyse large datasets, including text, audio and video files.

The software provides a user interface similar to other qualitative research tools, with essential functionalities for coding qualitative data and conducting analyses. However, QualCoder lacks some of the advanced features typically found in commercial QDA software.

Since version 3.6, QualCoder has included AI-assisted coding and AI chat features. It allows generating codes, summarizing texts, explaining fragments, performing semantic searches, and interactive queries via chat. Both cloud and local language models can be used, with configurable parameters and privacy options.

QualCoder is a desktop-only application that operates locally on a user’s computer. Projects can be exported and shared with other users, including those using REFI-QDA-compatible programs.

== See also ==
- Computer-assisted qualitative data analysis software
