= Quantitative Discourse Analysis Package =

Quantitative Discourse Analysis Package (qdap)
- Developer(s): Bryan Goodrich, Dason Kurkiewicz, Tyler Rinker
- Stable release: 2.4.2 / September 27, 2020; 4 years ago
- Operating system: Microsoft Windows, Linux, Mac OS
- Type: Qualitative data analysis, Discourse analysis
- License: GPL2 license
- Website: cran.r-project.org/web/packages/qdap/

Quantitative Discourse Analysis Package (qdap) is an R package for computer assisted qualitative data analysis, particularly quantitative discourse analysis, transcript analysis and natural language processing. Qdap is installable from, and runs within, the R system.

Qdap is a tool for quantitative analysis of qualitative transcripts and therefore provides a bridge between quantitative and qualitative research approaches. It is designed for transcript analysis, but its features overlap with natural language processing and text mining.

Its features include:

- tools for the preparation of transcript data
- frequency counts of sentence types, words, sentences, turns of talk, syllables
- aggregation using grouping variables
- word extracting and visualization
- statistical analysis.

For higher level statistical analysis and visualization of text, qdap is integrated with R and offers integration with other R packages.

== Alternatives ==
- KH Coder (Windows, Linux, macOS) for quantitative content analysis and text mining.

== See also ==
- Computer-assisted qualitative data analysis software
