= Qualitative Data Analysis Program =

Program at the University of Pittsburgh

QDAP
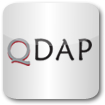

Location
- Pittsburgh, PA; USA

Information
- Motto: The Smart Way to Code Text

The Qualitative Data Analysis Program (QDAP) was founded in 2005 at the University of Pittsburgh in the University Center for Social and Urban Research. QDAP is a fee-for-service research laboratory that develops software and methods to support multi-coder annotation projects. In 2008, QDAP-UMass was opened at the University of Massachusetts Amherst. Researchers at QDAP developed the Coding Analysis Toolkit (CAT), which is a free, open source, web-based CAQDAS package.
