= RQDA =

Qualitative data analysis tool

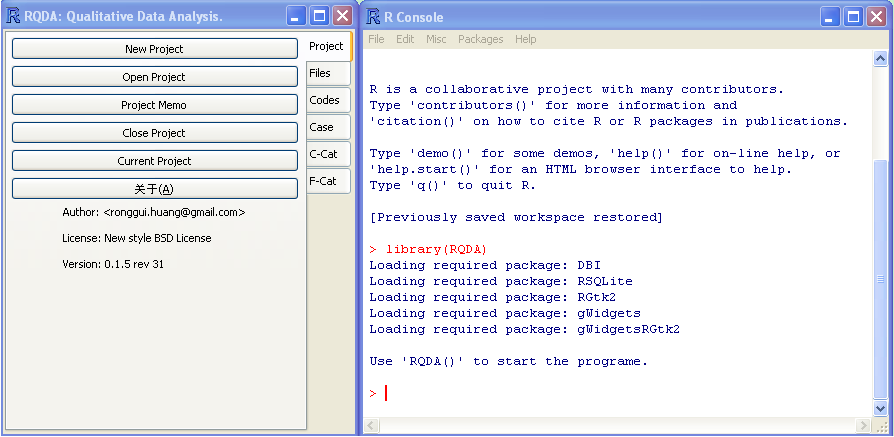
- Main window in RQDA
- Developer: Huang Ronggui
- Final release: 0.3-1 / Mar 2018
- Operating system: Microsoft Windows, Linux, macOS
- Type: Qualitative Data Analysis Qualitative Research
- License: New BSD license
- Website: rqda.r-forge.r-project.org
- Repository: github.com/Ronggui/RQDA

RQDA is an R package for computer-assisted qualitative data analysis or CAQDAS, making it one of the few open source tools to assist qualitative coding of textual data. Note that there are also other popular but mostly proprietary CAQDAS tools such as NVivo and Atlas.ti but these software come at a cost. RQDA was developed by Huang Ronggui during his PhD study at the City University of Hong Kong, which he still maintains until today.

RQDA is installable from, and runs within, the R statistical software, but has a separate window running a graphical user interface (through RGtk2). RQDA's approach allowed for tight integration of the constructivist approach of qualitative research with quantitative data analysis which can increase the rigor, transparency, and validity of qualitative research.

The use of RQDA is best grounded in the tradition of qualitative research where the main function of CAQDAS is to assist with the "coding" of textual data. The data could be a word (e.g., society), a concept (e.g., "social entrepreneurship"), a phrase (e.g., social entrepreneurship is a hybrid of commercial and social welfare logics), to a sentence or paragraph (e.g., "social enterprise concerns citizen-driven initiatives that aim to create public value. While the idea of social enterprise emerged officially since the 1980s, its actual practice predated to the tribal era where humans engaged in economic activities while simultaneously aiming to create collective social outcomes").

Researchers and analysts typically use RQDA using two types of coding approaches: inductive and deductive. In inductive coding, a researcher codes a body of text "from the ground up". That is, the textual units that are coded are not pre-determined by specific theory/literature/concepts but the texts are coded to discover new concepts/ideas/theories to emerge from the body of textual data. Meanwhile, in deductive coding, a researcher starts from a pre-specified framework/theory/literature and coded a body of textual data to confirm that such theory or concepts do exist in the data. The former is exploratory (to discover new concepts or ideas) and one does not care how many times (the frequency) a new concept occurs, while the latter is confirmatory (to unearth something new) and takes into account how many times a concept occurs in the body of text.

The use of CAQDAS for textual data coding should be grounded in the tradition in qualitative research. One notable example is the grounded theory approach by Corbin and Strauss (1990). See also grounded theory by Glaser and Strauss (2017).

One book on RQDA offers a systematic demonstration of its use by grounding it in on a systematic and structured approach in doing qualitative inductive coding a la Dennis Gioia, or known as the Gioia Methodology. This methodology has gained popularity in various fields, from management and organization studies, marketing, to public administration. This book contains multiple parts, some of the key components are: an overview of qualitative research, an overview of CAQDAS, how to conduct CAQDAS based qualitative research, how to do inductive coding, how to use data attributes and memos, how to aggregate or abstract codes to a higher level and visualizing them, and finally, how to reach closure in the analysis by formulating a grounded theory from the codes.

== Features ==
In the graphical interface it had the following functions:

- Import documents from plain text
- Support non-English documents, Simplified Chinese Character is well-tested under Windows
- Support character-level coding
- Memos for documents, codes, coding, project, files etc.
- Retrieve coding, and easily gets back to the original file. Conditional retrieval is supported as well.
- Single-file (*.rqda) format, which is basically the SQLite database
- Categorize codes (tree-like categories are avoided)
- Categorize files
- Search files by keywords and can highlight keyword in the open file
- Show attributes of files, which is useful for content analysis
- Categorise cases and related attributes of cases (to bridge qualitative and quantitative research)
- Search information about selected cases from the web
- Rename files, codes, code categories, cases etc.
- Write and organize fieldwork journals

Through use of R functions, it could:

- Import a batch of files
- Calculate the relation between two codings, given the coding indexes
- Give a summary of coding and inter-code relationship.
- Export file/case attributes and show subset of files/cases.
- Allow for more flexible conditional retrieval.
- Boolean operations of and, or and not.

The project was abandoned because of orphaned upstream packages.

== See also ==
- Computer-assisted qualitative data analysis software
