= Dovetail (disambiguation) =

A dovetail joint is used in woodworking.

Dovetail or dovetailing may also refer to:

- Dovetail (album), by Lee Konitz's Terzet, 1983
- Dovetail (company), an Australian software company
- Dovetail (restaurant), in New York City
- Dovetail Games, a British video game developer
- The Dovetail Group, an early video game developer
- Dovetail, or riffle, a method of shuffling playing cards
- Daniel Dovetail, Daisy Dovetail, Dora Dovetail, characters in The Ickabog by J. K. Rowling
- Dovetailing (computer science), a technique in algorithm design
- Dovetail rail, a standard mount for telescopic sights

== See also ==
- Dovedale (disambiguation)
- Dovetail Joint (band), a Chicago-based band
