= Taguette =

Open-source tool for textual qualitative data analysis

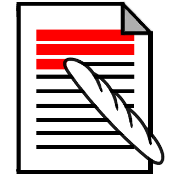
- Developers: Rémi Rampin; Vicky Rampin; Sarah DeMott
- Stable release: 1.5.1 / November 10, 2025; 5 months ago
- Written in: Python
- Operating system: Linux; macOS; Windows
- Type: Qualitative data analysis
- License: 3-clause BSD
- Website: www.taguette.org
- Repository: gitlab.com/remram44/taguette

Taguette is a free and open-source tool for textual qualitative data analysis. It allows users to import textual data, highlight and tag/code the data and export the results. The software is used in a wide range of fields such as anthropology, education, nursing, psychology, sociology and marketing.

== Features ==
Taguette is intended to help users analyse unstructured textural data such as: observations, interviews, documents and audiovisual materials. The software can import PDFs, Word Docs, Text files, HTML, EPUB, MOBI, Open Documents and Rich Text Files.

The software allows users to highlight words, sentences, or paragraphs and tag them with the codes either as an individual researcher, or as part of a team when the software is installed on a server.

Users report that there is a low learning curve and the collaborative nature of the software is highlighted. The lack of nested codes has been identified as a limitation by some users, however the developers state that the software allows users to nest codes, but currently they are not visually displayed in a tree.

== History ==
According to the developers, the motivation for creating Taguette was a lack of functional free software to undertake qualitative research. Initially created around late 2018, the release of version 1.0.0 in mid-2021 formalised its stable baseline. Since then, incremental updates have extended functionality, improved stability and support for more import formats.

== See also ==
- Computer-assisted qualitative data analysis software
