= List of causal mapping software =

This is a list of causal mapping software.

Causal mapping software enables users to create and/or work with causal maps: qualitative networks of interconnected nodes in which each connection represents a causal link.

Software and services for concept mapping can also be used for causal mapping if they allow the creation of directed links. They are only included here if they include any additional features specifically useful for causal mapping, such as:

- Calculation / simulation of downstream causal effects
- Ability to distinguish between different sources of evidence for individual links
- Ability to create causal links on the basis of highlighted passages of source text

== Causal mapping software ==
Application name	Status	Description and features	Platform	Price
Cauzality	Beta	An online tool to create knowledge maps. Features: Collaborative coding of causal links; Directed links; Display as a network	Online	
Compendium Institute	Full release	Provides a visual interface which aims to manage connections between ideas and information.	Offline	Free
DAGitty	Full release	An environment for editing, analysing and creating causal diagrams. Features: Directed links; Display as a network; Display causal influence via networks; Corresponding R package 'daggity'	Offline & Online	Free
Decision Explorer	Full release	A tool to help understand qualitative information. Features: Directed links; Quantitative analysis of coding; Display as a network	Offline & Online	Paid
Graph Commons	Full Release	Focuses on transforming data into interactive maps. Features: • Directed links • Display as a network • API	Online	Paid (Free version available)
Group Wisdom	Full release	Social research platform with group concept mapping. Features: Ability to deal with multiple sources; Display as a network	Online	Paid
Causal Map	Beta	An online research tool that allows the coding of text to build a causal map. Features: Qualitative coding of causal links in text; Display as a network; Filter and query the network; Ability to deal with multiple sources	Online	Paid (Free trial available)
Insight Maker	Full release	Causal loop diagram builder. Can be used for stock and flow analysis	Online	Free
Kialo	Full release	Responses from group debates are used to build a causal network. Features: discussion forum in tree form	Online	Free
Netway	Full release	Tool for building logic models and networks	Online	Free
Nineteen	Full release	Features: Quantitative analysis of coding; Ability to deal with multiple sources	Online	Free
Quirkos	Full release	Builds a map from the coding of text passages. Features: Coding of narrative text; Quantitative analysis of coding; Ability to deal with multiple sources; Has a cloud for sharing data	Offline	Paid
parEvo	Full release	Develop past histories or future scenarios, using a participatory evolutionary process to be used by multiple people to produce a collective good – a set of storylines. Features: Display the resulting links as a network; Generate transparent measures of the value created	Online	Free (invitation only)
Participatory System Mapper	Full release	PRSM focuses on collaboration when creating a causal map. • Collaborative coding of causal links • Display as a network • Directed links	Online	Free
STICKE	Full release	Builds maps for systems thinking in community knowledge exchange.		
sticky.studio	Full release	Real time collaborative mapping tool. Features: Collaborative coding of causal links; Directed links; Display as a network	Online	Free
System Effects	Full release	Generates 'personal systems maps' from participant responses. Features: Display as a network	Online	Paid
Cognizer	Full release	Features: Directed links: Ability to deal with multiple sources; Quantitative analysis of coding; Display as a network	Offline	Free
Kumu	Full release	Organises data into 'relationship maps' Features: Directed links; Ability to deal with multiple sources; Quantitative analysis of coding; Display as a network; Live import of data from Google Sheets	Online	Paid
Changeroo	Beta	A visualisation tool for the theory of change Features: Display as a network	Online	Paid (Free trial available)
TOCO	Beta/Early Access	Features: Display as a network	Online	Paid
CMAP 3	Full release	Features: Display as a network	Offline	Free
jMap	Full release	Features: • Display as a network • Graphically superimpose and compare the maps of individuals, groups and experts • Upload/download map data	Offline	Free
Leximancer	Full release	Features: • Software applies a model to automatically carry out qualitative analysis of text - no coding required. • Various data visualisation forms	Offline	Paid
