= Dovedale (disambiguation) =

Dovedale is a valley in the Peak District of England.

Dovedale or Dove Dale may also refer to:

- Dove Dale, a historic plantation house in South Carolina, U.S.
- Dovedale, Botswana
- Dovedale, New Zealand
- Dovedale cheese, a blue cheese
- Dovedale House, a youth centre in Ilam, Staffordshire, England
- Dovedale Primary School, a primary school in Liverpool, England

== See also ==
- Dovetail (disambiguation)
- MV Dovedale H, a ship, known later as Empire Tedburgh
