= Qiqqa =

Reference management software

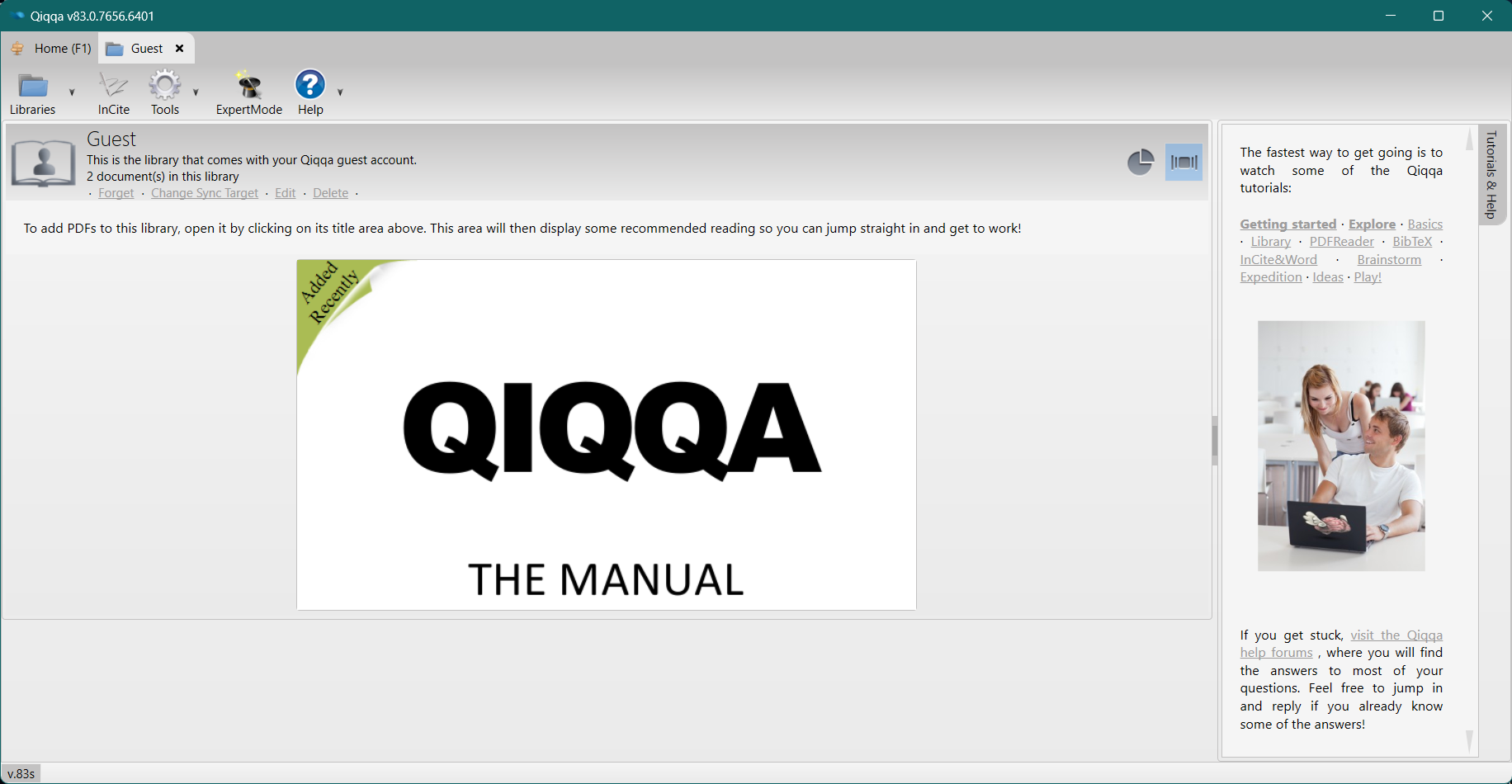
- Screenshot of Qiqqa v83s on Windows 11
- Release: April 2010; 16 years ago
- Stable release: Qiqqa v82 / October 2020; 6 years ago
- Operating system: Microsoft Windows; Android
- Available in: English
- Type: Reference management software
- License: GNU General Public License version 3
- Website: www.qiqqa.com

Qiqqa (pronounced "Quicker") is a free and open-source software that allows researchers to work with thousands of PDFs. It combines PDF reference management tools, a citation manager, and a mind map brainstorming tool. It integrates with Microsoft Word XP, 2003, 2007 and 2010 and BibTeX/LaTeX to automatically produce citations and bibliographies in thousands of styles.

The development of Qiqqa began in Cambridge, UK, in December 2009. A public alpha was released in April 2010, offering PDF management and brainstorming capabilities. Subsequent releases have seen the incorporation of the Web Library, OCR, integration with BibTeX and other reference managers, and the use of natural language processing (NLP) techniques to guide researchers in their reading.

In 2011, Qiqqa won both the University of Cambridge CUE and CUTEC, and the Cambridge Wireless Discovering Start-Ups competitions. Qiqqa was an award winner in the 2012 Santander Universities Entrepreneurship Awards.

In 2019, Qiqqa decided to change software pricing model and make it free and open-source: "After 10 years of your support we have decided to make Qiqqa open source so that it can be grown and extended by its community of thousands of active users." The open-source release included the features previously sold in the Premium editions, but the cloud-based Web Library synchronisation was removed because of storage costs, and users were advised to move their libraries to intranet libraries synchronised through services such as Google Drive or Dropbox. Web Library support was discontinued in 2021.

== See also ==
- Comparison of reference management software
- Computer-assisted qualitative data analysis software
