= Transana =

- Original author: Chris Fassnacht
- Developer: David K Woods University of Wisconsin-Madison Center for Education Research
- Initial release: October 5, 2001
- Stable release: 3.21 / November 7, 2017; 8 years ago
- Written in: Python
- Operating system: Mac OS, Microsoft Windows
- Available in: Multilingual (9)
- Type: Qualitative Data Analysis Qualitative Research
- License: Proprietary, used to be GPL
- Website: www.transana.com

Transana is a software package used to analyze digital video or audio data. Transana used to be a GPL licensed software, but has become proprietary software in recent releases.

== Features ==
Transana lets the user analyze and manage your data, transcribe it, identify analytically interesting clips, assign keywords to clips, arrange and rearrange clips, create complex collections of interrelated clips, explore relationships between applied keywords, and share your analysis with colleagues. The goal is to find a new way to focus on the data, and manage large collections of video and audio files and clips.

== History ==
Transana is a product of the Digital Insight Project, and it is being developed with funding from the National Science Foundation through the National Partnership for Computational Infrastructure at the San Diego Supercomputer Center and the TalkBank Project at Carnegie Mellon University.

== See also ==
- Computer assisted qualitative data analysis software
- TalkBank
