= Dedoose =

Academic research web application

Dedoose is an application for mixed methods research developed by academics from UCLA, with support from the William T. Grant Foundation, and is the successor to EthnoNotes.

Dedoose is an alternative to other qualitative data analysis software, explicitly aimed at facilitating rigorous mixed methods research. It is used by researchers funded by the William T. Grant Foundation, including among those in its Faculty Scholars Program. Dedoose and EthnoNotes have gained recognition for their integration of qualitative and quantitative data analysis methods in combination with interactive data visualizations. The Dedoose family of tools has been used in a wide variety of studies in many industries from medical, market research, social policy research, and other academic social science research

Dedoose is designed, developed, and operated by SocioCultural Research Consultants (SCRC), whose majority of ownership (i.e. 2 people) consists of academics from UCLA.

== System Crash ==
On May 6, 2014, Dedoose suffered a major system failure, resulting in the corruption and loss of significant amounts of data and service availability problems. All accounts created after March 2 and all data added after March 30 were erased. Data added to the system in March by existing users was restored to Dedoose on May 16. According to SCRC, the system crash involved a failure of its Microsoft Azure cloud services during a database backup. SCRC took full responsibility for the crash and pledged "to do all we can to help rebuild any project if there are tangible ways we can assist." Carl Straumsheim noted that "the Dedoose crash should serve as a warning to colleges and universities as they consider moving sensitive information to the cloud".

== Dedoose Interface ==
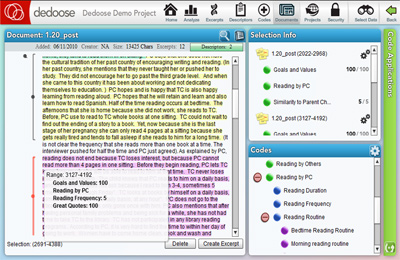
Codification of Qualitative Data

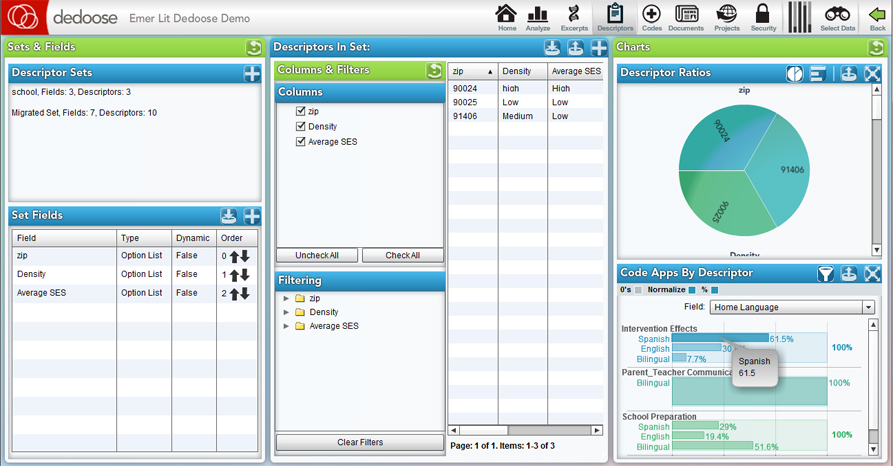
Integration of Quantitative Data

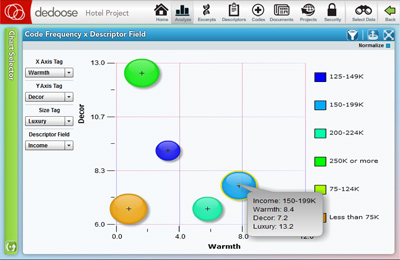
Interactive Mixed Methods Data Visualization Bubble Chart

== See also ==
- Computer assisted qualitative data analysis software
