= WordStat =

- Developer: Provalis Research
- Initial release: 1998
- Stable release: 9
- Operating system: Microsoft Windows
- Available in: Multilingual
- Type: Text mining, Content analysis, Text analytics, Sentiment Analysis
- License: Proprietary software
- Website: www.provalisresearch.com

WordStat is a content analysis and text mining software. It was first released in 1998 after being developed by Normand Peladeau from Provalis Research. The latest version 9 was released in 2021.

The software is mainly used for business intelligence and competitive analysis of web sites, sentiment analysis, content analysis of open-ended questions, theme extraction from social media data, etc.

== Some features of WordStat 9 ==
- Categorization of content using user defined dictionaries.
- Classification of documents using Naïve-Bayes or k-nearest neighbor algorithms applied either on words or concepts.
- Automatic topic extraction using first order (word co-occurrences) or second order (co-occurrence profiles) hierarchical clustering and multidimensional scaling.
- Topic modeling to extract the main themes using NNMF and Factor Analysis.
- Correspondence analysis in order to identify words or concepts (or content categories) associated with any categorical meta-data associated with documents.
- Pre-and post-processing with R and python script
- Analyze more than 70 languages including Chinese, Japanese, Korean, Thai.
- Interactive word clouds and word frequency tables can now be obtained directly on keyword retrieval and keyword-in-context (KWIC) results allowing one to quickly identify words associated with specific content categories, or those appearing, before, after a specific target item.
- Relate unstructured text with structured data such as dates, numbers or categorical data for identifying temporal trends or differences between subgroups or for assessing relationship with ratings or other kind of categorical or numerical data.
- Visualization tools to visualize and interpret text analysis results:
  - Dendrogram with optional bar chart
  - 2D and 3D Multidimensional scaling
  - Proximity plot
  - Heatmap (with dual clustering)
  - Bubble chart
  - Bar chart, pie chart, line chart, word clouds
  - Correspondence plots (2D and 3D)
