= RGtk2 =

Set of R wrappers for the GTK+ graphical user interface library

- Developer(s): Michael Lawrence and Duncan Temple Lang
- Stable release: 2.20.36 / 8 March 2019; 6 years ago
- Operating system: Cross-platform
- Platform: Cross-platform
- Type: widget toolkit
- License: GPL
- Website: www.ggobi.org/rgtk2

RGtk2 is a set of R wrappers for the GTK+ graphical user interface library. RGtk2 is free software and licensed under the GPL.

== Syntax ==
The code below will produce a 200x200 pixel window with the words "Hello World" inside.

library(RGtk2)

createWindow <- function()
{
    window <- gtkWindow()

    label <- gtkLabel("Hello World")
    window$add(label)
}

createWindow()
gtk.main()

== Notable applications that use RGtk2 ==
RGtk2 has been used in a number of notable applications, some examples:

- Rattle
- RQDA

== See also ==
- R (programming language) (The R statistical programming language)
