= Computer-assisted qualitative data analysis software =

Type of software

Computer-assisted (or aided) qualitative data analysis software (CAQDAS) offers tools that assist with qualitative research such as transcription analysis, coding and text interpretation, recursive abstraction, content analysis, discourse analysis, grounded theory methodology, etc.

== Definition ==
CAQDAS is used in psychology, marketing research, ethnography, public health and other social sciences. The CAQDAS networking project lists the following tools a CAQDAS program should have:

- Content searching tools
- Code grouping tools
- Linking tools
- Mapping or networking tools
- Query tools
- Alternative visual representation tools
- Writing and annotation tools

== Comparison of CAQDAS software ==
Application	Type	License	Source	Last Release	Analyses	OS Supported	Tools
Aquad	Client	Free – GPL	Open	2017-02	Text, Audio, Video, Graphics	Windows	Coding, Sequence Analysis, Exploratory Data Analysis
Atlas.ti	Client	Proprietary	Closed	2022-07	Text, Audio, Video, Graphic, Social Networks	Windows, macOS, iOS, Android, Cloud (web-based)	Coding, Aggregation, Query, Visualisation
Cassandre	Web-based/server	Free – GPL	Open	2018-10-09	Text	All (java-based)	Coding
CLAN	Client	Free – GPL	Open	2019-06-10	Text	Windows, macOS, Linux	Coding
Coding Analysis Toolkit (CAT)	Web-based	Free – GPL	Open	2014-06-28	Text	All (web browser)	Coding
Compendium	Client	Free – LGPL	Open	2014-02	Text	All (java-based)	Coding
Dovetail	Web-based	Proprietary	Closed	2024-10-14	Text, Audio, Video	All (web browser)	Coding, Query, Visualisation
Dedoose	Client	Proprietary	Closed	2025-05-29	Text, Audio, Video	Windows, macOS, Linux (via Wine)	Coding, Query, Visualisation, Statistical Tools
ELAN	Client	Free – GPL	Open	2018-12-12	Audio, Video	Windows, macOS, Linux	Coding
KH Coder	Client	Free – GPL	Open	2015-12-29	Text	Windows, macOS, Linux	
MAXQDA	Client	Proprietary	Closed	2019-02-05	Text, audio, video, pictures, webpages, social networks	Windows, macOS	Coding, Aggregation, Query, Visualisation, Statistical Tools
NetMiner	Client	Proprietary	Closed	2026-02	Text	Windows, macOS	Word Extraction, Query, Text Network, Statistical Tools, Visualisation
NVivo	Client	Proprietary	Closed	2023-04	Text, audio, video, pictures, webpages	Windows, macOS	Coding, Aggregation, Query, Visualisation
QDA Miner	Client	Proprietary	Closed	2016-11		Windows	
QDA Miner Lite	Client	Proprietary	Closed	2017-01-12	Text	Windows	Coding
Qiqqa	Client	Proprietary	Closed	2016-09		Windows, Android	
QualCoder	Client	Free – MIT	Open	2026-01-19	Text, audio, video, PDF, pictures	Windows, macOS, Linux	Coding, Aggregation, Query, Visualisation
Quantitative Discourse Analysis Package (qdap) (R package)	Client	Free – GPL	Open	2019-01-02	Text	Windows, macOS, Linux	Word extracting, statistical analysis, visualization
Quirkos	Client / Web-based	Proprietary	Closed	2025-01	Text	Windows, macOS, Linux, All (web browser)	Coding, Query, Visualisation
RQDA (R package)	Client	Free – GPL	Open	2018-03	Text	Windows, macOS, Linux	Coding, Aggregation, Query, Visualisation
Taguette	Client / Web-based	Free – BSD	Open	2025-11-10	Text	Windows, macOS, Linux	Coding
Transana	Client	Proprietary, used to be GPL	Closed	2017-11	Text, Audio, Video	Windows, macOS	Coding
XSight	Client	Proprietary	Closed	2006 (abandoned)		Windows	
ThematicAnalysis.ai	Web-based	Proprietary	Closed	2026	Text	All (Web broser)	AI-assited Coding

== Project Exchange Format ==
In 2019, the Rotterdam Exchange Format Initiative (REFI) launched a new open exchange standard for qualitative data called QDA-XML, however, the Computer Assisted Qualitative Data Analysis (CAQDAS) Network Project had been formally established in 1994. The aim is to allow users to bring coded qualitative data from one software package to another. Support was initially adopted by Atlas.ti, QDA Miner, Quirkos and Transana, and has since been implemented into Dedoose, MAXQDA, NVivo and more. Although this was not the first standard to be proposed, it was the first to be implemented by more than one software package, and came as the result of a collaboration between vendors and community representatives from the research community. Previously there was very little capability to bring data in from other software packages.

== Training ==
The CAQDAS Network Project hosts events on the use of CAQDAS packages for qualitative and mixed-methods analysis. They include:

- fee-based in-person short courses
- open-registration Webinars designed to raise awareness
- open-registration Webinars that are methodological or pedagogical in nature
- podcasts

== Pros and cons ==
Such software helps to organize, manage and analyse information. The advantages of using this software include saving time, managing huge amounts of qualitative data, having increased flexibility, having improved validity and auditability of qualitative research, and being freed from manual and clerical tasks. Concerns include increasingly deterministic and rigid processes, privileging of coding, and retrieval methods; reification of data, increased pressure on researchers to focus on volume and breadth rather than on depth and meaning, time and energy spent learning to use computer packages, increased commercialism, and distraction from the real work of analysis.

== See also ==
- Comparison of survey software
- Multimethodology
- Computer Assisted Mixed Methods Research Analysis Software
- Qualitative economics
- Qualitative marketing research
- Qualitative psychological research
- Quantitative research
- Sampling (case studies)
- Sensemaking

== -External links ==
- The CAQDAS networking project maintained by the University of Surrey offers advice and reviews on various software packages.
- Harald Klein's comprehensive guide to CAQDAS
