= PsyDok =

PsyDok is a former open access document server for psychology. Originally supported by Saarland University and State Library (SULB) since 2003, it was operated by the Leibniz Institute of Psychology (ZPID) from 2016 on. In 2022, publications from PsyDok were moved to the subject repository PsychArchives maintained by ZPID. More than 3,700 documents formerly archived in PsyDok are now accessible via PsychArchives.

== History ==
PsyDok was set up with the support of the DFG (Deutsche Forschungsgemeinschaft) as part of the third-party project "Digital Psychology Information" at the Saarland University and State Library (SULB). The aim of the project, which was carried out together with ZPID until 2005, was to improve the information available in the subject of psychology with regard to online information and digital publications. In 2016, when funding for PsyDok ended, ZPID took over the operation of the platform from SULB. To ensure the long-term availability of the publications stored in PsyDok, they were included in the disciplinary repository PsychArchives maintained by ZPID in 2022.
