= QDA Miner =

Qualitative data analysis software

- Developer: Provalis Research
- Initial release: 2004
- Stable release: 6 / September 2020
- Operating system: Microsoft Windows
- Available in: Multilingual
- Type: Qualitative data analysis, qualitative research
- License: Proprietary software
- Website: www.provalisresearch.com

QDA Miner is mixed methods and qualitative data analysis software developed by Provalis Research. The program was designed to assist researchers in managing, coding and analyzing qualitative data.

QDA Miner was first released in 2004 after being developed by Normand Peladeau. The latest version 6 was released in September, 2020. QDA Miner is widely used for qualitative research. It is used by market researchers, survey companies, government, education researchers, crime and fraud detection experts, journalists and others.

The data typically used with this qualitative research software comes from (among others), journal articles, script from TV or radio news, social media (such as Facebook, Twitter or reviews from websites), interviews or focus group transcripts and open-ended questions from surveys.

== Release history ==
- QDA Miner 1: January 2004
- QDA Miner 2: June 2006
- QDA Miner 3: October 2007
- QDA Miner 4: December 2011
- QDA Miner 4 Lite: November 2012, a free variant of QDA Miner with reduced functionality
- QDA Miner 5: December 2016
- QDA Miner 6: September 2020

== Features of QDA Miner 6 ==
- New Grid mode for coding shorter responses
- Quotation Matrices
- Enhanced annotation feature
- Word frequency analysis and interactive word cloud
- Importation of Nexis UNI and Factiva Files
- Improved Importation of Excel, CSV and TSV files
- Deviation Table
- Export Results to Tableau Software
- Numerical Transformation
- Binning
- Support of Missing Values
- Silhouette plot
- Date transformation
- Improved code filtering feature
- Donut, Radar, 100% Stacked Bar and Area Charts
- Ordering of series in comparison charts
- Color Coding of items in Correspondence Plot
- Improved Bubble Chart
- Link Analysis Buffer
- New Table Format and Table Editor
- Several new options and interface improvements have been made to existing dialog boxes (code color selection, graphic options, etc.), management and analysis features.

== Features of QDA Miner 5 ==
- Import different formats of documents and images: PDF, Word, Excel, HTML, RTF, SPSS files, JPEG, etc.
- Import data from Facebook, Twitter, Reddit, RSS feeds within the software
- Import from directly reference managers tools and emails
- Perform GIS mapping with qualitative data
- Text retrieval tools: Keyword Retrieval, Query-by-Example, Cluster Extraction.
- Statistical functions: Coding frequencies, cluster analysis, coding sequences, coding by variables.
- Visualization tools: multidimensional scaling, heatmaps, correspondence analysis graphic, proximity plot.
- GeoTagging (GIS) and Time-Tagging tools
- Report manager tool to store queries and analysis results, tables and graphs, research notes and quotes.
