= Dovedale, Botswana =

Village in the Central District, Botswana

Coordinates: 23°31′25″S 27°2′39″E

Location of Dovedale

Dovedale is a village in Central District of Botswana. The village is located close to the Limpopo river and the border with South Africa, 50 km south-east of Mahalapye, and it has a primary school. The population was 706 in 2001 census.
