= ATLAS.ti =

Data analysis software

- Developer(s): Lumivero / ATLAS.ti Scientific Software Development GmbH
- Stable release: 24 / See here: https://atlasti.com/updates
- Operating system: Windows; Mac OS; iOS; Android
- Type: Qualitative data analysis
- License: Proprietary software
- Website: www.atlasti.com

ATLAS.ti is a computer-assisted qualitative data analysis software that facilitates analysis of qualitative data for qualitative research, quantitative research, and mixed methods research.

== Description and usage ==
ATLAS.ti is a tool that supports locating, coding/tagging, and annotating features within bodies of unstructured data; it also offers visualization functions. The software is used by researchers in a wide variety of fields, and it supports data in text, graphical, audio, video, and geospatial format. Through XML export, it also aims to provide a non-proprietary, cross-platform interface to facilitate academic collaboration.

== Development history ==
A prototype of ATLAS.ti was developed by Thomas Muhr at Technische Universität Berlin in the context of project ATLAS (1989–1992). A first commercial version of ATLAS.ti was released in 1993 to the market by company "Scientific Software Development", later ATLAS.ti Scientific Software Development GmbH. ATLAS.ti's founders have ascribed its methodological roots in part to grounded theory and content analysis. ATLAS.ti is currently available for Windows, Mac, Android, iOS, and via a web-based Cloud portal. ATLAS.ti was acquired by Lumivero, the parent company of NVIVO in September 2024.

== See also ==
- Computer-assisted qualitative data analysis software
