= MAXQDA =

Software program

- Developer: VERBI GmbH
- Release: 1995
- Stable release: 26.3 (Win and Mac) / 17 June 2026; 4 months ago
- Operating system: Microsoft Windows, Mac OS
- Available in: Multilingual (15)
- Type: Qualitative Data Analysis Qualitative research
- License: Proprietary software
- Website: www.maxqda.com

MAXQDA is a computer-assisted qualitative data analysis (CAQDAS) application used for qualitative and mixed methods research. Developed and distributed by VERBI Software in Berlin, Germany, it runs on Windows and macOS and supports projects containing textual materials, PDFs, images, audio and video (including transcripts), and structured survey data.

Its functions include organizing and coding source materials, writing memos, retrieving and querying coded segments, managing cases and associated variables, and producing tables and visualizations. The software also supports inter-coder agreement checks and mixed methods workflows that link qualitative codes to numerical attributes.

== Products ==
=== MAXQDA Standard ===
The standard version of MAXQDA for macOS and Windows offers tools for the organisation and analysis of qualitative data. This includes text, audio, image, video and bibliographical files as well as survey data, Twitter tweets or focus group transcripts. The data can be analysed in a four-screen window with the help of codes and memos. MAXQDA includes some quantitative data analysis tools (e.g. Mixed Methods tools).

=== MAXQDA Analytics Pro ===
MAXQDA Analytics Pro is an edition of MAXQDA that combines the core qualitative and mixed methods features with MAXDictio (for quantitative content analysis) and a statistics module (“Stats”). The Stats module provides tools to analyze data from MAXQDA projects - such as codes, cases, and variables - using descriptive statistics and cross-tabulations, and can also work with external datasets imported from spreadsheet files or SPSS formats.

=== MAXQDA Reader ===
The MAXQDA Reader makes it possible to read and search MAXQDA projects without owning a license. Projects cannot be edited.

== Version history ==
- 1989: MAX (DOS)
- 2001: MAXqda (Windows)
- 2003: MAXDictio (Add on for quantitative text analysis)
- 2005: MAXMaps (Add on for visual mapping)
- 2007: MAXQDA 2007 (Windows)
- 2010: MAXQDA 10 (Windows)
- 2012: MAXQDA 11 (Windows)
- 2012: MAXApp for iOS (iOS App)
- 2014: MAXApp for Android (Android App)
- 2014: MAXQDA 11 (Mac OS X)
- 2015: MAXQDA 12 (Universal for Windows and Mac OS X)
- 2016: VERBI releases two new products: MAXQDA Base and MAXQDA Analytics Pro
- 2017: MAXQDA 2018 (Universal for Windows and macOS)
- 2019: MAXQDA 2020 (Universal for Windows and macOS)
- 2021: MAXQDA 2022 (Universal for Windows and macOS)
- 2023: MAXQDA 24 (Universal for Windows and macOS)
- 2025: MAXQDA 26 (Universal for Windows and macOS)

== Features of MAXQDA ==
- Import of text documents, tables, audio, video, images, surveys
- Data is stored in project file
- Reading, editing and coding data
- Paraphrasing
- Settings links from one part of a document to another
- Annotating data with memos
- Visualization options (number of codes in different documents etc.)
- Group Comparison
- Analyse code combinations
- Import and export demographic information (variables) from and to SPSS and Excel
- Import of online surveys from SurveyMonkey
- Import of web pages with the free browser add-on MAXQDA Web Collector
- Analyse of responses to survey questions
- Searching and tagging words
- Transcription of audio and video files
- Internal program media player
- Linking data with georeferences (*.kml)
- Tools for summarizing content
- Code with Emoticons and Symbols
- Export to text, excel, html, xml and special reports
- Create Frequency Tables and Charts
- QTT Workspace
- TeamCloud
- User management
- Statistical analysis of qualitative data

== See also ==
- Computer-assisted qualitative data analysis software

== Literature ==
- Juliet Corbin and Anselm Strauss: Basics of Qualitative Research: Techniques and Procedures for Developing Grounded Theory, 3rd edition, 2008, SAGE Publications, Los Angeles, London, New Delhi, Singapore
- Ann Lewins and Christina Silver: Using Software in Qualitative Research: A Step-by-Step Guide, 2nd edition, 2014, SAGE Publications, Los Angeles, London, New Delhi, Singapore
