= Health Psychology Review =

- Discipline: Health psychology
- Language: English
- Edited by: Martin Hagger

Publication details
- History: 2007-present
- Publisher: Taylor & Francis
- Frequency: Quarterly
- Impact factor: 7.241 (2016)

Standard abbreviations
- ISO 4: Health Psychol. Rev.

Indexing
- ISSN: 1743-7199 (print); 1743-7202 (web)
- LCCN: 2007243476
- OCLC no.: 475672106

Links
- Journal homepage; Online access

Health Psychology Review is a quarterly peer-reviewed medical review journal covering health psychology. It was established in 2007 and is published by Taylor & Francis on behalf of the European Health Psychology Society, of which it is the official journal. The editor-in-chief is Martin Hagger (Curtin University and University of Jyväskylä). According to the Journal Citation Reports, the journal has a 2016 impact factor of 7.241.
