= Dovetail (company) =

Australian software company

- Type: Private
- Industry: Software
- Founded: 2017; 9 years ago
- Founders: Benjamin Humphrey, Bradley Ayers
- Headquarters: Sydney, Australia
- Website: dovetail.com

Dovetail is an Australian software company. Users create tags to perform transcription analysis and coding interpretation of interviews, survey responses and feedback, and create summarized insights from their research analysis.

In August 2021, Dovetail raised AU$5 million at a reported valuation of "more than AU$150 million"; raising its valuation fivefold from its prior fundraising round in 2020. Dovetail raised further Series A funding of US$63 million, led by Accel in January 2022.

== History ==
The company was founded in 2017 in Sydney, Australia by Benjamin Humphrey and Bradley Ayers. Both had worked at software company Atlassian, and Humphrey claims he started Dovetail based on his experience working with researchers at the company.

Prior to the company's founding, Humphrey worked on the idea in his spare time, outsourcing the product's development and financing it with a AU$10,000 credit card debt. In 2017 he convinced Ayers to leave his role at Atlassian and join as co-founder.

In November 2017, Dovetail was awarded the AU$25,000 minimum viable product grant from the New South Wales Department of Industry Jobs for NSW program. The grant was awarded to fund investment in automatic sentiment analysis features.

In February 2020, Dovetail announced a AU$4 million seed fundraising round led by Blackbird Ventures, with participation from Felicis Ventures and Culture Amp's CEO and co-founder Didier Elzinga to accelerate revenue growth. This raise reportedly valued Dovetail at "close to AU$30 million".

In August 2021, Dovetail announced that it had raised AU$5 million from existing investors Blackbird Ventures, Felicis Ventures, along with participation from Mike Cannon-Brookes' investment vehicle, Grok Ventures.

In January 2022, Dovetail announced it had raised a US$63 million Series A led by Accel. New investors also included Webflow CEO and co-founder Vlad Magdalin, CEO and co-founder of Checkr, Daniel Yanisse, and CEO and co-founder of Slack, Stewart Butterfield.

In 2023, Dovetail's headquarters moved to a new office spanning 4,300 square metres over four levels located on Sydney's historic Oxford Street. In January 2024, Ayers left the company after stepping down to an engineering role in the previous year.

In November 2024, Dovetail's senior company lawyer sued the company and founder Benjamin Humphrey over a "personal relationship." In February 2025, it was revealed the case was brought to the Federal Court, with the Dovetail and Mr Humphrey being sued for sexual harassment and discrimination.
