= Qualitative psychological research =

Psychological research with qualitative methods

Qualitative psychological research is psychological research that employs qualitative methods.

Qualitative research methodologies are oriented towards developing an understanding of the meaning and experience dimensions of human lives and their social worlds. Good qualitative research is characterized by congruence between the perspective that informs the research questions and the research methods used.

== Definition ==
Many techniques and methods join in qualitative research. Sullivan et al. (2018, p. 17) identify some commonly occurring features of qualitative research in Psychology:

- A tendency to use relatively unstructured data (…);
- An approach to theory that involves generating theories that are localised and context specific, rather than testing large-scale theories that seek to explain psychological process in all people (…);
- A tendency to use data-analysis practices that seek out themes in the data (…);
- A focus on language and the way things are represented in text (…);
- An interest in the perspectives, sense-making and individual experiences of people (…).

== Main authors ==
=== Lincoln & Guba ===
The work of Yvonna Lincoln and Egon Guba is an example of a contribution to the field of qualitative research.

== Types ==
=== Conversation Analysis ===
Conversation analysis is a type of qualitative research in the field of sociology.

=== Discourse Analysis ===
Discourse analysis is type of qualitative research in the field of sociolinguistics.

=== Narrative Analysis ===
Narrative analysis is a type of qualitative research in the social sciences.

=== Grounded Theory ===
Grounded theory is a type of qualitative research in the social sciences.

=== Historical Analysis ===
Historical analysis is a type of qualitative research in the social sciences.

=== Focus-grouping ===
According to Lederman, focus-grouping is a "technique that involves the use of profound group interviews in which participants are selected because they are a purposive sampling of a specific population, with the group being 'focused' on a given topic." According to Powell et al., a group of individuals selected and gathered by researchers to discuss and comment on, from personal experience, the topic that is the subject of the research form a focus-group.

Some of the features of focus-group discussions include each member's participation, a number of consecutive meetings, common characteristics of members with respect to interests, the collection of qualitative data, and discussion that is focused on a topic that is determined by the purposes of the research.

One of the main purposes of focus-group discussions is to get insight into each participant's phenomenological world, including the individual's thinking, perceiving, and feeling, which may be largely independent of a group or its cultural and social settings. The group discussion is thought to make it likely that the participant's phenomenal world will revealed in the context of the participant's interaction with other members of the focus group. Focus-group discussions help in elaborating the different viewpoints and emotional processes of each member within a group. The individual interview is simpler for the researcher to control, but a focus-group discussion helps the researcher to obtain more information in less time than individual interviews ordinarily take. However, focus-group discussions are still organized and planned. The discussions are especially helpful when there are differences relating to power between its members, decision-makers, or professionals; and when the researcher or a member wants to understand and explore the level of consensus on a given topic.

== See also ==
- Center for Qualitative Psychology
- Quantitative psychological research
- Qualitative research
