= Multimethodology =

Research based on more than one method of collecting data

Multimethodology or multimethod research includes the use of more than one method of data collection or research in a research study or set of related studies. Mixed methods research is more specific in that it includes the mixing of qualitative and quantitative data, methods, methodologies, and/or paradigms in a research study or set of related studies. One could argue that mixed methods research is a special case of multimethod research. Another applicable, but less often used label, for multi or mixed research is methodological pluralism. All of these approaches to professional and academic research emphasize that monomethod research can be improved through the use of multiple data sources, methods, research methodologies, perspectives, standpoints, and paradigms.

The term multimethodology was used starting in the 1980s and in the 1989 book Multimethod Research: A Synthesis of Styles by John Brewer and Albert Hunter. During the 1990s and currently, the term mixed methods research has become more popular for this research movement in the behavioral, social, business, and health sciences. This pluralistic research approach has been gaining in popularity since the 1980s.

== Multi and mixed methods research designs ==
There are four broad classes of research studies that are currently being labeled "mixed methods research":

1. Quantitatively driven approaches/designs in which the research study is, at its core, a quantitative study with qualitative data/method added to supplement and improve the quantitative study by providing an added value and deeper, wider, and fuller or more complex answers to research questions; quantitative quality criteria are emphasized but high quality qualitative data also must be collected and analyzed;
2. Qualitatively driven approaches/designs in which the research study is, at its core, a qualitative study with quantitative data/method added to supplement and improve the qualitative study by providing an added value and deeper, wider, and fuller or more complex answers to research questions; qualitative quality criteria are emphasized but high quality quantitative data also must be collected and analyzed;
3. Interactive or equal status designs in which the research study equally emphasizes (interactively and through integration) quantitative and qualitative data, methods, methodologies, and paradigms. This third design is often done through the use of a team composed of an expert in quantitative research, an expert in qualitative research, and an expert in mixed methods research to help with dialogue and continual integration. In this type of mixed study, quantitative and qualitative and mixed methods quality criteria are emphasized. This use of multiple quality criteria is seen in the concept of multiple validities legitimation. Here is a definition of this important type of validity or legitimation: Multiple validities legitimation "refers to the extent to which the mixed methods researcher successfully addresses and resolves all relevant validity types, including the quantitative and qualitative validity types discussed earlier in this chapter as well as the mixed validity dimensions. In other words, the researcher must identify and address all of the relevant validity issues facing a particular research study. Successfully addressing the pertinent validity issues will help researchers produce the kinds of inferences and meta-inferences that should be made in mixed research"(Johnson & Johnson, 2014; page 311).
4. Mixed priority designs in which the principal study results derive from the integration of qualitative and quantitative data during analysis.

== Desirability ==
The case for multimethodology or mixed methods research as a strategy for intervention and/or research is based on four observations:

1. Narrow views of the world are often misleading, so approaching a subject from different perspectives or paradigms may help to gain a holistic or more truthful worldview.
2. There are different levels of social research (i.e.: biological, cognitive, social, etc.), and different methodologies may have particular strengths with respect to one of these levels. Using more than one should help to get a clearer picture of the social world and make for more adequate explanations.
3. Many existing practices already combine methodologies to solve particular problems, yet they have not been theorised sufficiently.
4. Multimethodology fits well with pragmatism.

== Feasibility ==
There are also some hazards to multimethodological or mixed methods research approaches. Some of these problems include:

1. Many paradigms are at odds with each other. However, once the understanding of the difference is present, it can be an advantage to see many sides, and possible solutions may present themselves.
2. Multimethod and mixed method research can be undertaken from many paradigmatic perspectives, including pragmatism, dialectical pluralism, critical realism, and constructivism.
3. Cultural issues affect world views and analyzability. Knowledge of a new paradigm is not enough to overcome potential biases; it must be learned through practice and experience.
4. People have cognitive abilities that predispose them to particular paradigms. Quantitative research requires skills of data-analysis and several techniques of statistic reasoning, while qualitative research is rooted in in-depth observation, comparative thinking, interpretative skills and interpersonal ability. None of the approaches is easier to master than the other, and both require specific expertise, ability and skills.

== Pragmatism and mixed methods ==
Pragmatism allows for the integration of qualitative and quantitative methods as loosely coupled systems to support mixed methods research. On the one hand, quantitative research is characterized by randomized controlled trials, research questions inspired by literature review gap, generalizability, validity, and reliability. On the other, qualitative research is characterized by socially constructed realities and lived experiences. Pragmatism reconciles these differences an integrates quantitative and qualitative research as loosely coupled systems, where "open systems interact with each other at the point of their boundaries."

=== History of Pragmatism in Multi/Mixed Methods Research ===
Developed as a philosophical method to solve problems towards the end of the nineteenth century, pragmatism is attributed to the work of philosopher Charles Sanders Peirce. For Peirce, research is conducted and interpreted from the eye of the beholder, as a practical approach to investigating social affairs. He sees science as a communal affair leading to single truths that are arrived at from multiple perspectives. For Peirce, the research conclusions are not as important as how these conclusions are reached. Focus is on answering the research question while allowing the methods to emerge in the process. Peirce pragmatism and its approach to research support qualitatively driven mixed methods studies.

John Dewey extends both, "Peirce pragmatic method and (William) James' radical empiricism (and approach to experience) by application to social and political problems." His philosophical pragmatism takes an interdisciplinary approach, where the divide between quantitative and qualitative research represents an obstacle to solving a problem. In Dewey's pragmatism, success is measured by the outcome, where the outcome is the reason to engage in research. Live experiences constitute reality, were individual lived experiences form a continuum by the interaction of subjective (internal) and objective (external) conditions. In Dewey's continuum of experiences, no experience lives on its own, it is influenced by the experiences that preceded it, and influences those that will follow it. His approach to knowledge is open-minded, and inquire is central to his epistemology.

Following Dewey, quantitatively driven research methods dominated until 1979, when Richard Rorty revived pragmatism. Rorty introduces his own ideas into pragmatism which includes the importance of culture, beliefs, and context. He shifts from understanding how things are to how they could be, and introduces the idea that "justification is audience dependent, and pretty much any justification finds a receptive audience" As Rorty explains, research success is peer dependent, not peer group neutral. From his perspective, MMR is not simply the merging of quantitative and qualitative research, but a third camp with its own peers and supporters.

=== Pragmatic philosophical positions ===
Multiple pragmatic philosophical stands may be used to justify pragmatism as a paradigm when conducting mixed methods research (MMR). A research paradigm provides a framework based on what constitutes and how knowledge is formed. Pragmatism as a philosophy may aid researchers in positioning themselves somewhere in the spectrum between qualitatively driven and quantitatively driven methods. The following philosophical stands can help address the debate between the use of qualitative and quantitative methods, and to ground quantitatively, qualitatively, or equal-status driven MMR.

==== Radical empiricism ====
Radical empiricism, as articulated by William James, takes reality as a function of our ongoing experiences, constantly changing at the individual level. James emphasizes that reality is not predetermined, and individual free will and chance matter. These ideas fit well with qualitative research emphasizing lived experiences. James also finds the truth in empirical and objectives facts, merging the divide between qualitative and quantitative research. However, James points out that no truth is independent of the thinker. James' brand of pragmatism may be used by researchers conducting qualitatively and equal-status driven MMR.

==== Dialectical Pluralism ====
Dialectical pluralism is a form of pragmatism that emphasizes intentionally drawing from multiple approaches to conducting research and developing knowledge. The multiple approaches being taken need not agree or converge with one another. Instead, the researcher using dialectical pluralism in the conduct of a mixed-method study may tack back and forth between models and perspectives in order to develop insight.

==== Realism and Critical Realism ====
Realists and critical realists take the perspective that the world exists independently of our observation and interpretation of it; critical realism goes beyond this to assert that multiple interpretations of the world are likely. Like dialectical pluralism, realist paradigms in the context of pragmatic multi/mixed-methods research emphasize the idea that multiple approaches to knowledge are expected and can be treated as complementary. In contrast to a more strict positivist approach, critical realism sees causality as embedded in the details of a situation and social processes that surround an event.

==== Transformative-Emancipatory ====
Transformative and emancipatory paradigms emphasize a commitment on the part of the researcher to social justice, as in critical race theory. Researchers conducting multi-method or mixed-methods research within this paradigm tend to orient to issues of "power, privilege, and inequity."

== In contrast to quantitative and qualitative methodologies ==
One major similarity between mixed methodologies and qualitative and quantitative taken separately is that researchers need to maintain focus on the original purpose behind their methodological choices. A major difference between the two, however, is the way some authors differentiate the two, proposing that there is logic inherent in one that is different from the other. Creswell (2009) points out that in a quantitative study the researcher starts with a problem statement, moving on to the hypothesis and null hypothesis, through the instrumentation into a discussion of data collection, population, and data analysis. Creswell proposes that for a qualitative study the flow of logic begins with the purpose for the study, moves through the research questions discussed as data collected from a smaller group and then voices how they will be analysed.

A research strategy is a procedure for achieving a particular intermediary research objective — such as sampling, data collection, or data analysis. We may therefore speak of sampling strategies or data analysis strategies. The use of multiple strategies to enhance construct validity (a form of methodological triangulation) is now routinely advocated by methodologists. In short, mixing or integrating research strategies (qualitative and/or quantitative) in any and all research undertaking is now considered a common feature of good research.

A research approach refers to an integrated set of research principles and general procedural guidelines. Approaches are broad, holistic (but general) methodological guides or roadmaps that are associated with particular research motives or analytic interests. Two examples of analytic interests are population frequency distributions and prediction. Examples of research approaches include experiments, surveys, correlational studies, ethnographic research, and phenomenological inquiry. Each approach is ideally suited to addressing a particular analytic interest. For instance, experiments are ideally suited to addressing nomothetic explanations or probable cause; surveys — population frequency descriptions, correlations studies — predictions; ethnography — descriptions and interpretations of cultural processes; and phenomenology — descriptions of the essence of phenomena or lived experiences.

In a single approach design (SAD)(also called a "monomethod design") only one analytic interest is pursued. In a mixed or multiple approach design (MAD) two or more analytic interests are pursued. Note: a multiple approach design may include entirely "quantitative" approaches such as combining a survey and an experiment; or entirely "qualitative" approaches such as combining an ethnographic and a phenomenological inquiry, and a mixed approach design includes a mixture of the above (e.g., a mixture of quantitative and qualitative data, methods, methodologies, and/or paradigms).

A word of caution about the term "multimethodology". It has become quite common place to use the terms "method" and "methodology" as synonyms (as is the case with the above entry). However, there are convincing philosophical reasons for distinguishing the two. "Method" connotes a way of doing something — a procedure (such as a method of data collection). "Methodology" connotes a discourse about methods — i.e., a discourse about the adequacy and appropriateness of particular combination of research principles and procedures. The terms methodology and biology share a common suffix "logy." Just as bio-logy is a discourse about life — all kinds of life; so too, methodo-logy is a discourse about methods — all kinds of methods. It seems unproductive, therefore, to speak of multi-biologies or of multi-methodologies. It is very productive, however, to speak of multiple biological perspectives or of multiple methodological perspectives.

== See also ==
- Perestroika Movement (political science)
- Post-autistic economics
- Computer-assisted qualitative data analysis software
