= Qualitative Research (journal) =

- Discipline: Research Methods
- Language: English
- Edited by: Bella Dicks, Karen Henwood, William Housley

Publication details
- History: 2001-present
- Publisher: SAGE Publications
- Frequency: Bimonthly
- Impact factor: 3.141 (2018)

Standard abbreviations
- ISO 4: Qual. Res.

Indexing
- ISSN: 1468-7941 (print); 1741-3109 (web)
- LCCN: 2009233391
- OCLC no.: 47226463

Links
- Journal homepage; Online access; Online archive

Qualitative Research is a bimonthly peer-reviewed academic journal covering qualitative research methods in the fields of sociology and other social sciences. It was established in 2001 and is published by SAGE Publications. The founding editors were Sara Delamont and Paul Atkinson. The current editors-in-chief are Bella Dicks, Karen Henwood, and William Housley (Cardiff University).

== Abstracting and indexing ==
The journal is abstracted and indexed in Scopus, and the Social Sciences Citation Index. According to the Journal Citation Reports, its 2023 impact factor was 3.2.

== 2022 retraction of a research note ==
On April 26, 2022, the journal published a "research note" by Karl Andersson, a PhD student and publisher of pederastic magazine Destroyer, with the title "I am not alone – we are all alone: Using masturbation as an ethnographic method in research on shota subculture in Japan". The note received negative attention from academics and journalists in August 2022, prompting the journal to launch an investigation and remove the note. On August 22, 2022, the journal retracted the note, explaining that while it "has systems in place to flag ethical concerns raised by article submissions prior to review, those same systems do not fully extend to note submissions", that the "two peer reviewers who considered the note did not raise ethical concerns", and that Andersson explained that "the work described in this note was carried out as a piece of independent research in Germany, without institutional ethical oversight". The controversy prompted Greater Manchester Police to investigate the case, and SAGE to review its submission processes. In a paper published in Publishing Research Quarterly on September 14, 2022, sociologist Casey Brienza argued that the retraction has "troubling implications for freedom of speech". After an internal investigation, the University of Manchester ended its association with the controversial researcher in 2023.
