= Clinical ethnography =

Approach in psychological anthropology

Clinical ethnography is a term first used by Gilbert Herdt and Robert Stoller in a series of papers in the 1980s. As Herdt defines it, clinical ethnography

is the intensive study of subjectivity in cultural context...clinical ethnography is focused on the microscopic understanding of sexual subjectivity and individual differences within cross-cultural communities. What distinguishes clinical ethnography from anthropological ethnography in general is (a) the application of disciplined clinical training to ethnographic problems and (b) developmental concern with desires and meanings as they are distributed culturally within groups and across the course of life.

Clinical ethnography has strong similarities to person-centered ethnography, a term used by Robert I. Levy, a psychoanalytically trained psychiatrist, to describe his anthropological fieldwork in Tahiti and Nepal in the 1960s-1980s and used by many of his students and interlocutors. In practice the two approaches overlap but seem to differ in emphasis: clinical ethnography seems to be used more by anthropologists writing about sexuality or medical anthropology (particularly psychiatric anthropology, e.g. Luhrmann 2000, or anthropology of mental illness), while person-centered ethnography, though sometimes addressing these topics, more often focuses on the study of self and emotion cross-culturally. Person-centered anthropology also implies a style of ethnographic writing that emphasizes psychological case studies.

Both represent a continuation of an older tradition within psychological anthropology and Culture and Personality studies particularly. Scholars in this tradition have had their primary training in anthropology or psychiatry (or rarely both) and have conducted ethnographic fieldwork strongly informed by psychodynamic theories (though not necessarily orthodox Freudian theory), some degree of training in psychiatric or clinical psychological interviewing techniques, and attention to a set of issues including the role of culture in or the cross-cultural study of emotions, sexuality, identity, the experience of self, and mental health. Figures in this larger tradition include but are not limited to: Jean Briggs, George Devereux, Cora Du Bois, A. Irving Hallowell, Abram Kardiner, Ralph Linton, Melford Spiro, and at least tangentially Gregory Bateson, Margaret Mead, and Marvin Opler.

Active research and training programs in clinical ethnography today include the Clinical Ethnography and Mental Health track in the Department of Comparative Human Development at the University of Chicago, and some of the qualitative researchers at the National Sexuality Resource Center, directed by Gilbert Herd at San Francisco State University. Aside from Herdt, scholars using the term include Andrew Boxer, Bertram J. Cohler, and Tanya Luhrmann, as well as many of their students.

== See also ==
- Creative participation
- Educational psychology
- Naturalistic observation
- Scholar-practitioner model
- Qualitative research

== Bibliography ==
- Herdt, Gilbert (1999) "Clinical ethnography and sexual culture." Annual Review of Sex Research 10:100-19.
- Herdt, Gilbert and Robert J. Stoller (1990) Intimate Communications: Erotics and the Study of Culture. New York: Columbia University Press.
- Levy, Robert I. (1973) Tahitians: mind and experience in the Society Islands. Chicago: University of Chicago Press.
- Levy, Robert I. and Douglas Hollan (1998) "Person-Centered Interviewing and Observation in Anthropology." pp. 333–364 in Handbook of Methods in Cultural Anthropology, edited by H. R. Bernard. Walnut Creek, CA: Altamira Press.
- Luhrmann, Tanya M. (2000) Of two minds: The growing disorder in American psychiatry. New York, NY, US: Alfred A. Knopf, Inc.
- Luhrmann, Tanya M. (2004) "Metakinesis: How God Becomes Intimate in Contemporary U.S. Christianity." American Anthropologist 106:518-528.
