= Cora Du Bois =

American anthropologist and academic

Cora Alice Du Bois
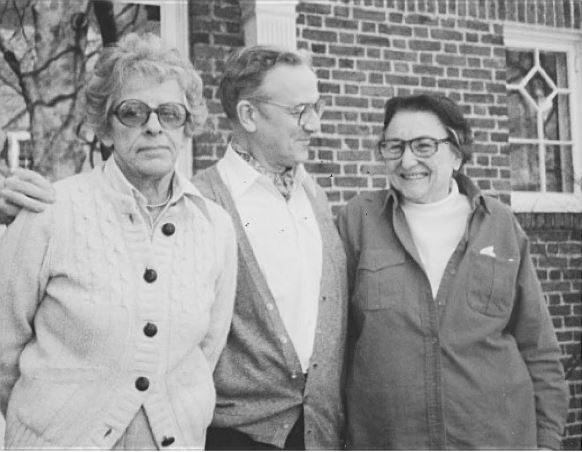
- Jeanne Taylor, Gérard Du Bois, and Cora Du Bois (1980)
- Born: Cora Alice Du Bois; October 26, 1903; New Jersey, US
- Died: April 7, 1991 (aged 87); Brookline, Massachusetts, US
- Education: Barnard College, Columbia University, University of California, Berkeley
- Occupation: Anthropologist
- Known for: Culture and personality studies and psychological anthropology
- Notable work: Wintu Ethnography (1935); The Feather Cult of the Middle Columbia (1938); The 1870 Ghost Dance (1939); The People of Alor (1944); Social Forces in Southeast Asia (1949)
- Title: President, American Anthropological Association (1968–69); President, Association for Asian Studies (1969–70)
- Partner: Jeanne Taylor
- Awards: Exceptional Civilian Service Award; Order of the Crown of Thailand

Cora Alice Du Bois (October 26, 1903 – April 7, 1991) was an American cultural anthropologist and a key figure in culture and personality studies and in psychological anthropology more generally. She was Samuel Zemurray Jr. and Doris Zemurray Stone-Radcliffe Professor at Radcliffe College from 1954. After retirement from Radcliffe, she was Professor-at-large at Cornell University (1971–1976) and for one term at the University of California, San Diego (1976).

She was elected Fellow of the American Academy of Arts and Sciences in 1955, president of the American Anthropological Association in 1968–1969, and of the Association for Asian Studies in 1969–1970, the first woman to be allowed that honor.

== Early life and education ==
Du Bois was born in New York City on October 26, 1903, to Mattie Schreiber Du Bois and Jean Du Bois, immigrants to the U.S. from Switzerland. She spent most of her childhood in Perth Amboy, New Jersey, where she graduated from Perth Amboy High School. She spent a year studying library science at the New York Public Library and then attended Barnard College, graduating with a B.A. in history in 1927. She earned an M.A. in history from Columbia University in 1928.

Encouraged by an anthropology course taught by Ruth Benedict and Franz Boas at Columbia, Du Bois moved to California to study anthropology with Native American specialists Alfred L. Kroeber and Robert Lowie. She received her Ph.D. in anthropology at the University of California, Berkeley in 1932. Du Bois's doctoral dissertation, "Girls' Adolescence Observations in North America" covered the topic of puberty and menstrual customs and how they are viewed among Native Americans. The topic was recommended by a fellow graduate student, but she considered it a very dull and tedious library job. Du Bois was more interested in the question of the dividing line between cultural behavior and psychologically foundational human behavior, and thought this specific physiological condition (menstruation) would be a good place to study this question. However, there was not sufficient data available to her at that time.

== Early work ==
In part due to prejudices against women academics, she was initially unable to find a university position. She remained at Berkeley as a teaching fellow and research assistant from 1932 to 1935. In 1932, Du Bois's Tolowa Notes was published in American Anthropologist. This article explored the culture of the Tolowa people, with data from Agnes Mattez, a full-blooded Tolowa woman of forty-five. Subjects discussed in the text include the puberty and marriage preparation ceremonies for girls. The puberty ceremony includes the piercing of the girl's nasal septum and fasting, while the marriage ceremony includes bride prices discussed before marriage, and the presentation of gifts to the prospective mother-in-law.

She conducted salvage ethnography on several Native American groups of northern California and the Pacific Northwest, including the Wintu Indians of northern California. This endeavor was published as A Study of Wintu Myths in The Journal of American Folklore. Its main focus is on how the Wintu myths changed or remained stable. In the study, Du Bois and her co-author Dorothy Demetracopoulou divided the data into different groups, including the literary aspects of the mythology, the recorded myth, which includes the determination of the time and language factors of recording, and change and stability in Wintu mythology. Of the stories discussed in the text, there are three main categories. First are the bolas, which take up the bulk of storytelling. Second are the ninas, which are based on love songs. The third and final type are anecdotes, which is a name used by the researchers themselves, not the Wintu. Certain beliefs of the Wintu were also discussed, such as the stories having an effect on the weather if not told at the right time. She published The 1870 Ghost Dance in 1939, a study of a religious movement among Native Americans in the Western U.S.

In 1935, Du Bois received a National Research Council Fellowship to undertake clinical training and explore possible collaborations between anthropology and psychiatry. She spent six months at the Boston Psychopathic Hospital, now the Massachusetts Mental Health Center, and six months at the New York Psychoanalytic Society. In New York she worked with psychiatrist Abram Kardiner, who became her mentor and collaborator for several projects in cross-cultural diagnosis and the psychoanalytic study of culture. Du Bois also taught at Hunter College in 1936–1937 while developing a fieldwork project to test their new ideas.

Published in 1937, Du Bois's Some Anthropological Perspectives on Psychoanalysis discussed the relationship between Anthropology and Psychoanalysis. Du Bois stated that The first anthropological theory was a biological outgrowth of a biological analogy.

== Work in Indonesia and OSS ==
From 1937 to 1939, Du Bois lived and conducted research among the Abui people on the island of Alor, part of the Dutch East Indies, now Indonesia. She collected detailed case studies, life-history interviews, and administered various personality tests (including Rorschach tests), which she interpreted in collaboration with Kardiner and published as The People of Alor: A Social-Psychological Study of an East Indian Island in 1944. One of her major theoretical advances in this work was the concept of "modal personality structure". With this notion she modified earlier ideas in the Culture and Personality school of anthropology on "basic personality structure" by demonstrating that, while there is always individual variation within a culture, each culture favors the development of a particular type or types, which will be the most common within that culture. Her work strongly influenced other psychiatric anthropologists, including Robert I. Levy, with his person-centered ethnography, and Melford Spiro.

Like many other American social scientists during World War II, Du Bois served as a member of the Office of Strategic Services (OSS) working in the Research and Analysis Branch as Chief of the Indonesia section. In 1944, she moved to Ceylon (now Sri Lanka) to serve as chief of research and analysis for the Army's Southeast Asia Command.

For her service to the country in the OSS, Du Bois received the Exceptional Civilian Service Award from the United States Army in 1946. The Thai government honored her with the Order of the Crown of Thailand in 1949 for her efforts during the war on behalf of Thailand.

== Later work and Harvard career ==
She left the OSS after World War II, and from 1945 to 1949 was Southeast Asia Branch Chief in the State Department's Office of Intelligence Research. In 1950, she declined an appointment to succeed Kroeber as head of the anthropology department at Berkeley rather than sign the California Loyalty Oath required of all faculty members. Du Bois worked for the World Health Organization in 1950–1951. In 1954, she accepted an appointment at Harvard University as the second person to be the Samuel Zemurray Jr. and Doris Zemurray Stone-Radcliffe Professor at Radcliffe College. She was elected a Fellow of the American Academy of Arts and Sciences in 1955. She was the first woman tenured in Harvard's Anthropology Department in 1954 and the second woman tenured in the Faculty of Arts and Sciences at Harvard. During this time, Du Bois wrote The Dominant Value Profile of American Culture, with the goal of describing the views on American values and the ideas that can be drawn from them. In this text, she discussed how oppositional propositions are used in America. Since most of them are more spurious than genuine, they lack consistency and are thereby unhelpful in describing American values. The four basic premises and three focal values that can be drawn from them are key information in this work. The four basic premises are 1) the universe is mechanistically conceived, 2) man is its master, 3) men are equal, and 4) men are perfectible. The three focal values that can be drawn from them are "material well-being that derives from the premise that man is a master of a mechanistic universe; conformity that derives from the premise of man's equality; effort-optimism that derives from man's perfectibility. Du Bois asserts that these assumptions have proved valid for the American middle class over the last 300, and expects that to continue in the future.

She reviewed widely. In 1950, she wrote that The Kalingas, Their Institutes, and Custom Law by R. F. Barton was believed to be one of his best pieces on the customary laws of the Philippines Tribes in the Mountain Province of Luzon. In 1957, she reviewed Chinese Society in Thailand: An Analytical History by G. William Skinner, comparing it to works by Victor Purcell and Kenneth Landon. Du Bois described Purcell's work as a monumental compilation.

She conducted research between 1961 and 1967 in the temple city of Bhubaneswar in the Indian state of Orissa, where a number of graduate students in Anthropology and Social Relations conducted fieldwork.

In 1970, she retired from Harvard but continued teaching as Professor-at-large at Cornell University (1971–1976) and for one term at the University of California, San Diego (1976). Most of her research materials and personal papers are held in the Tozzer Library at Harvard University. Some are in the Regenstein Library at the University of Chicago.

== Personal life ==
Du Bois met Jeanne Taylor, another OSS employee, in Ceylon. There she began a lesbian relationship with her. They lived together as a couple and in the mid-1950s they visited Paul and Julia Child in Paris. Du Bois's obituary in The New York Times called Taylor "her longtime companion". Du Bois and Taylor, according to her Harvard Library biography, "enjoyed an active social life" together.

== Death ==
Cora Du Bois, aged 87, died from pneumonia and heart failure on April 11, 1991, in Brookline, Massachusetts.

== Selected works ==
- Wintu Ethnography. Berkeley, California: University of California. 1935.
- "Some Anthropological Perspectives on Psychoanalysis". The Psychoanalytic Review. 24 (3). National Psychological Association for Psychoanalysis: 246–263. July 1937. ISSN 0033-2836.
- The Feather Cult of the Middle Columbia. Menasha, Wisconsin: George Banta Publishing Co. 1938.
- The 1870 Ghost Dance. Berkeley, California: University of California Press. 1939.
- The People of Alor: A Social-Psychological Study of an East Indian Island. Minneapolis, Minnesota: University of Minnesota Press. 1944.
- Social Forces in Southeast Asia. Minneapolis, Minnesota: University of Minnesota Press. 1949.
- Review of The Kalingas, Their Institutes, and Custom Law. Arlington, Virginia: American Anthropological Association, 1950.
- Foreign Students and Higher Education in the United States. Washington, D.C.: American Council on Education. 1956.
- Review of Chinese Society in Thailand: An Analytical History. Philadelphia, Pennsylvania: The American Academy of Political and Social Science, 1957.

== Interlocutors ==
- Abram Kardiner, psychiatrist
- Ralph Linton, anthropologist

== Notable students ==
- Jean Briggs, cultural and psychological anthropologist, Canadian Inuit
- Richard Taub, sociologist
- Richard A. Shweder, cultural anthropologist and cultural psychologist, Orissa
