= American Association for Applied Psychology =

For the American Association of Retired Persons, see AARP

The American Association for Applied Psychology (AAAP) was founded in 1937 as a national organization for clinical, consulting, educational, and business/industrial psychologists. It lasted for only eight years, merging with the American Psychological Association in 1945. Although short-lived, it has been claimed that some of its work led to what is now the basis of certain models of training in the field.

== Origins ==
Applied psychologists who were without PhDs or did not have academic affiliations were not, early in the 20th century, given full membership privileges at the scientifically oriented American Psychological Association (APA). The AAAP, by contrast, accepted these psychologists.

It had grown from the New York Association of Consulting Psychologists (NYACP), established in 1921 through the efforts of Leta Hollingworth and others. A practitioner with a University of Pennsylvania PhD but no academic affiliation named David Mitchell became the NYACP's first president. The NYACP soon began reaching out to applied psychologists in other states, changing its name to the Association of Consulting Psychologists (ACP) in 1930.

== Creation of AAAP ==
It was, ironically, at the 1936 meeting of the rival APA at Dartmouth College that a dinner meeting was held where it was decided to expand the ACP into a fully national organization called the AAAP. In 1937, the remnants of the old Clinical Section of the APA officially disbanded and re-formed as the first Division of the new AAAP. It was immediately followed by Divisions for Consulting, Educational, and Business/Industrial psychology. A Military Psychology Division was added later. The first president of the AAAP was Douglas H. Fryer. Later well-known presidents included Donald G. Paterson, Walter V. Bingham, Albert Poffenberger, and Carl Rogers. During World War II, the U.S. military had a great need of professionals to treat soldiers with battle fatigue and other mental illnesses. In response, a committee of the APA led by David Shakow, who had already started this work on a similar committee within the structure of the AAAP established formal guidelines for the training of the clinical psychologists. The guidelines established the scientist-practitioner model of training.

== Merger With APA ==
At the end of the War, the APA and AAAP merged to form a new APA in which scientists and practitioners had equal standing in the association. The new organization adopted the divisional structure of the old AAAP, adding twelve new Divisions to the old AAAP's five (there are now over 50). The new APA also held meetings to establish guidelines for clinical training, essentially adopting David Shakow's earlier document at a landmark meeting in Boulder, Colorado.
