= Doctor of Psychology =

Doctoral degree

The Doctor of Psychology (Psy.D. or D.Psych.) is a professional doctoral degree intended to prepare graduates for careers that apply scientific knowledge of psychology and deliver empirically based service to individuals, groups and organizations. Earning the degree was originally completed through one of two established training models for clinical psychology. However, Psy.D. programs are no longer limited to clinical psychology as several universities and professional schools have begun to award professional doctorates in business psychology, organizational development, forensic psychology, counseling psychology, and school psychology.

== Background ==
The initial guidelines for the education and training of clinical psychologists were established in 1949 at an American Psychological Association (APA)-sponsored Conference on Training in Clinical Psychology in Boulder, Colorado. Students would be prepared both to conduct experimental research and apply knowledge to clinical practice. This approach became known as the scientist–practitioner model, though it is often referred to as the Boulder model since the conference was held in Boulder, Colorado.

The difficulty in integrating education and training for research and practice within the same degree has long been recognized. While the scientist–practitioner model ostensibly included clinical training, many argued that preparation for practice was often neglected. Some also argued that in trying to train students in both research and practice, not enough emphasis was placed on either. In regard to research, the modal (most common) number of publications by graduates of a PhD program was zero. In regard to practice, students were not being trained effectively for the needs of people seeking services.

While the scientist–practitioner model "stood intransigent and impervious through the 1950s and 60s", the APA attempted to respond to pressure for more and better clinical training by forming the Committee on the Scientific and Professional Aims of Psychology in 1963. The Committee concluded that the scientist–practitioner model failed to do either of the jobs for which it was designed and recommended several important changes, including: establishing separate practice-oriented programs, potentially in locations other than university psychology departments; developing a practice-oriented training model; and using the Doctor of Psychology (PsyD) degree to designate preparation for clinical practice. The Committee's conclusions and recommendations met with controversy. In particular, opponents said a different degree would impact the field's prestige and ignore science. Proponents, however, argued it would be informed by science and that other practice-oriented healthcare disciplines, such as medicine, had well-respected professional degrees.

In 1973, the APA sponsored the Conference on Levels and Patterns of Training in Vail, Colorado. Conference members concluded that psychological knowledge had matured sufficiently to warrant creating distinct practice-oriented programs. Members also concluded that if the education and training for practice differs from research, then different degrees should reflect that: when emphasis is on preparing students for providing clinical services, the Doctor of Psychology (PsyD) degree should be awarded; when the focus is on preparing students for conducting experimental research, the Doctor of Philosophy (PhD) degree should be awarded. This approach became known as the practitioner-scholar model, also known as the Vail model. Graduates of both training models would be eligible for licensure in all jurisdictions in the United States, and the licensing exams and renewal requirements would be the same for both degrees.

With the creation of the Doctor of Psychology degree, the APA confirmed that the PsyD is a credential that certifies attainment of the knowledge and skills required to establish clinical psychology as a profession. Furthermore, it follows the policies of both the Association of American Universities, and the Council of Graduate Schools: a professional doctorate (e.g., D.D.S., D.V.M., J.D., and M.D./D.O.) is awarded in recognition of preparation for professional practice, whereas the PhD is awarded in recognition of preparation for research.

== Education and clinical training ==
The practice of clinical psychology is based on an understanding of the scientific method and behavioral science. The focus of the Doctor of Psychology training model is on the application of this knowledge for direct clinical intervention. This includes the diagnosis and treatment of mental illness, as well as cognitive and emotional impairments in which psychological approaches may be of use. Compared to a PhD, the PsyD places less emphasis on research. Students from PsyD programs receive about the same number of clinical training hours as PhD students before an internship.

Doctor of Psychology programs take four to seven years to complete, and are typically slightly shorter than PhD programs (due to the lesser focus on research training and approximately equivalent clinical training requirements). Students in these programs receive a broad and general education in scientific psychology and evidence-based treatment. Coursework includes: Biological bases of behavior; cognitive-affective bases of behavior; social-cultural bases of behavior; lifespan development; assessment and diagnosis; treatment and intervention; research methods and statistics; and ethical and professional standards. Specialized training (e.g., neuropsychology, forensic psychology, psychodynamic psychology) is also available in some programs.

Students in doctoral psychology programs receive extensive clinical training through placements in various settings (e.g., community mental health centers, hospitals, juvenile halls, college counseling centers). These placements provide direct patient contact supervised by a licensed psychologist. Clinical training culminates in a 1,750–2,000-hour (one-year full-time or two-year half-time) supervised internship.

To complete the PsyD degree, students typically must demonstrate several competencies: 1) knowledge mastery through passing comprehensive exams, 2) clinical skill through successful completion of a pre-doctoral internship, and 3) scholarship through a doctoral research project. Regional accreditation is available to doctoral programs in clinical psychology.

The doctoral degree allows for broader career options in schools, private or independent practice, clinics, hospitals, or research/academia. Individuals with doctoral degrees may experience greater eligibility for various credentials.

As stated above, there are three different doctoral degrees for school psychology: PhD, PsyD, and EdD. Career options for those with a PhD may include being a school psychologist with a license at any level (preschool, primary, secondary, or after), a professor for school psychology for graduate students, screening for possible recruits for a school psychology program, or a postdoctoral resident. Overall, those with a PhD have more opportunities for leadership positions. Those with this degree can work in settings other than schools. Those with a PhD are more likely to create student development workgroups and review proposals for conventions. They have been known to become editors for Best Practices, work with the editors in chief of journals, members of the NASP Communique Editorial Board, reviewers for the National School Psychology Certification Board, and part of NASP's Social Justice Committee. Some school psychologists choose to continue practicing in a K–12 setting but encourage more trained school staff for professional development—i.e, for functional behavioral assessments and behavior intervention plans. Those who have obtained a PhD have a greater opportunity to conduct comprehensive neuropsychological evaluations for educational and forensic purposes, review medical/legal records for forensic assessment, and see clients for therapy. These individuals may even develop new rating scales for the field. Those with this degree have the opportunity to be recognized as a member of the APA.

Career options for those who attain an EdD may include becoming a university professor, creating school policy, focusing on administration, educational technology, and district-wide leadership, and assisting in adult education, curriculum, and instruction. These areas can be divided into three subgroups: research and academia, management, and influence. If the individual chose to be involved in research and academia, they could teach at public/private universities and conduct/publish research. The knowledge and experience gained through the doctorate program are imperative for a successful academic career. A doctorate is not required for management in some school districts; however, the degree, experience, and education can help in competitive positions. All the experience and knowledge acquired help to understand education from a different perspective.

For those training in school psychology programs, PsyD training usually takes four to six years to complete. Like in clinical and counseling programs, it is generally slightly shorter than PhD training. Once the PsyD is earned, the school psychologist becomes eligible for licensure as a psychologist from an APA-approved program. PsyD career options may include private practice, working in university based settings (undergraduate teaching or other practitioner–scholar PsyD programs), working in community-based mental health centers (behavioral health, etc.), working in outpatient settings, clinics for individual or group therapy, or working for juvenile justice programs (work with incarcerated youth). It is recommended to work in the field before pursuing a school psychology doctoral degree.

Doctoral training programs may be approved by NASP and/or accredited by the APA. In 2007, approximately 125 programs were approved by NASP, and APA accredited 58 programs. Another 11 APA-accredited programs were combined (clinical/counseling/school, clinical/school, or counseling/school).

== Licensing ==
A license to practice as a clinical psychologist is required in the United States as well as all over the globe. While specific requirements vary by jurisdiction, every state mandates: 1) completing a 1-year full-time or 2-year half-time supervised clinical internship totaling 1,750–2,000 hours and 2) passing the national and state licensing exams. Most states require an additional postdoctoral year of supervised training after earning the doctorate to become eligible to take the national and state licensing exams.

Maryland and Washington have removed the one-year postdoctoral experience instead of requiring two years of supervised experience, both of which can be completed before graduation. In February 2006, the APA Council of Representatives adopted a statement recommending that this change also be made to the licensing requirements of other states since the nature of training has changed dramatically in the last 50 years. Previously, doctoral-level students accrued most of their clinical hours during internship and postdoctoral fellowships. Students accrue most of their clinical hours during their training and internship. Thus, they are ready to begin practice upon graduation. Next, there are considerably fewer positions available for recent graduates, and providing the training before graduation facilitates early career psychologists.

== Licensing Exam [EPPP] ==
In the United States, a doctoral degree from a program acceptable to the licensing board is required. The PhD, PsyD, and EdD are among the doctorate degrees that make individuals eligible to sit for the Examination for Professional Practice of Psychology (EPPP). The EPPP is the national licensing examination in the United States and Canada, and its completion is required to obtain a license to practice psychology.

While there is an increasing number of university-based PsyD programs, many PsyD programs are at newer professional schools of psychology.

== See also ==
- American Psychological Association
- Doctor of Clinical Psychology (U.K. / Australasian equivalent)
- Practitioner–scholar model
- Scientist–practitioner model
- Training and licensing of clinical psychologists
