= Virginia Braun =

Academic in psychology and gender studies

Virginia Braun FRSNZ
- Education: Loughborough University
- Scientific career
- Fields: thematic analysis and gender studies
- Workplaces: University of Auckland
- Thesis: The vagina: an analysis (2000)
- Academic advisors: Sue Wilkinson and Celia Kitzinger

Virginia Braun FRSNZ is a New Zealand psychology academic specialising in thematic analysis and gender studies. She is particularly known for her scholarship on the social construction of the vagina and designer vagina cosmetic surgery, body hair and heterosexuality. She is perhaps best known for her collaboration with British psychologist Victoria Clarke around thematic analysis and qualitative research methods. Together they have published numerous papers, chapters, commentaries and editorials on thematic analysis and qualitative research, and an award-winning and best selling qualitative textbook entitled Successful qualitative research. They have a thematic analysis website at The University of Auckland. More recently - with the Story Completion Research Group - they have published around the story completion method.

== Academic career ==
After undergraduate and masters studies in psychology at the University of Auckland, Braun received a Commonwealth Scholarship to Loughborough University with Celia Kitzinger and Sue Wilkinson as her advisors for her 2000 thesis, The vagina: an analysis.

Braun returned to as a lecturer in psychology Auckland in 2001, rising to full professor in 2017.

Her 2006 paper "Using thematic analysis in psychology" with Victoria Clarke in Qualitative Research in Psychology has more than 240,000 citations according to Google Scholar. It is also - according to Google Scholar - the most cited academic paper published in 2006, and according to Nature, the 9th most cited research paper of all time.

Braun was editor of Feminism & Psychology between 2008 and 2013. She received a Distinguished Leadership Award from the American Psychological Association's Committee on Women in Psychology in 2013.

In 2015/2016 Braun went public with her experiences seeking a tubal ligation.

In 2021, Braun was awarded the Marsden Medal by the New Zealand Association of Scientists, in recognition of "her global impact on the development of qualitative empirical methods and for the generosity of spirit she expresses through this work." She was elected a Fellow of the Royal Society of New Zealand in 2022.

== Areas of expertise ==
- Sex and sexuality
- Sexual health
- Gendered bodies
- Genital cosmetic surgery
- Body hair
- Food
- Feminist psychology
- Critical psychology
- Qualitative research
- Thematic analysis

== Books ==
- Virginia Braun and Victoria Clarke, Thematic Analysis: A Practical Guide. 2021.
- Virginia Braun, Victoria Clarke and Debra Gray, Collecting qualitative data. A practical guide to textual, media and virtual techniques. Cambridge University Press. 2017. ISBN 9781107054974
- Virginia Braun and Victoria Clarke, Successful qualitative research: A practical guide for beginners. Sage. 2013. ISBN 9781847875822

== Selected journal articles and book chapters ==
- Using thematic analysis in psychology
- Reflecting on reflexive thematic analysis
- Using thematic analysis in counselling and psychotherapy research: A critical reflection
- (Mis)conceptualising themes, thematic analysis, and other problems with Fugard and Potts’ (2015) sample-size tool for thematic analysis
- Thematic analysis
- Feminist qualitative methods and methodologies in psychology: A review and reflection
- Innovations in qualitative methods
- Reflecting on qualitative research, feminist methodologies and feminist psychology: In conversation with Virginia Braun and Victoria Clarke
