= Data ethnography =

Data ethnography is a type of qualitative research where the purpose is to explore the life of data and how they are incorporated into everyday activities.

== Ethnography ==
An ethnography is a qualitative research method that involves the observation of discourse and behavior of a community. It aims to analyze and understand the culture, decision-making and social dynamics of a group. It is usually conducted in the form of participant observation over an extended period, but it can also include in-depth interviews, as well as hermeneutic reading of documents such as emails and websites.

== Defining data ethnography ==
There has been a public concern regarding the size of data and how it is consumed, especially with the immense spread of technological devices and sensors that produce vast amounts of data about the world, which is then circulated to various users, including people, businesses, and individuals. Furthermore, it becomes necessary to analyze the data, a byproduct of human interaction, using qualitative methods such as ethnography: a data ethnography explores the interchanges within online communities and data-mediated interactions

It is a means of understanding social worlds within data consumption. It involves how users consume data, how they are circulated and how data shapes how people interact and live their lives.

== Examples ==
Researchers Coletta and Kitchin (2017) conducted a data ethnography where they used extended observation and interviews in a traffic control room in Dublin, to examine the capture, processing, and acting of real-time data that is generated by "Internet of Things" technologies.

Tanweer et al (2016) took advantage of extended observations and in-depth interviews to study the pseudonymous Data Science Collaboration. It involves data science methodology experts being matched with domain researchers to develop methods that make better sense of datasets.

Lehtiniemi and Ruckenstein (2019) conducted a data ethnography of MyData, a Finnish data activism initiative that encourages more user control of personal data. Over four years, the researchers relied on participant observation in research projects and collaborative activities and made use of informal discussions, participating in a Facebook discussion group and interviewing stakeholders, as well as organizing and attending events.
