= Victoria Clarke (psychologist) =

Academic researcher and chartered psychologist

- Education: Loughborough University
- Scientific career
- Fields: qualitative methods, human sexuality, feminist psychology and queer psychology
- Workplaces: University of the West of England
- Thesis: Lesbian and gay parenting: a feminist social constructionist analysis (2002)

Victoria Clarke is a UK-based chartered psychologist and a Professor of Qualitative Psychology at the University of the West England, Bristol. Her work focuses on qualitative psychology and critical psychology, and her background and training is in the fields of women studies, feminist psychology, LGBTQ psychology, and qualitative methods. She is particularly known for her ongoing collaboration with Professor Virginia Braun around qualitative methods. Braun and Clarke developed a widely cited approach to thematic analysis in 2006 and have published extensively around thematic analysis since then.

== Higher education ==
Victoria Clarke completed an undergraduate degree in psychology at Brunel University; she graduated in July 1997. After graduation, Clarke started a PhD in the Department of Social Sciences at Loughborough University supervised by Professor Celia Kitzinger (and later Professor Jonathan Potter and Professor Sue Wilkinson). Her PhD - in women's studies and psychology – focused on lesbian and gay parenting. This research further advanced the intersection between queer psychology and qualitative methods – she explored the social construction of LGBT parenting from both a queer studies and critical psychological perspective. Clarke graduated from Loughborough in July 2002. Lastly, Clarke got her postgraduate certificate in higher education at University of the West England, Bristol, graduating in July 2004.

== Career ==
Between October 1997 and March 2002, Clarke was a PhD student in the Department of Social Sciences at Loughborough University. Her PhD research explored the social construction of lesbian and gay parenting – in psychology and mainstream media. She published papers on television talk show debates about same-sex parenting, on arguments used by opponents of same-sex parenting to justify their opposition to equality for lesbian and gay families and arguments about children's need for male role models and 'concerns' about homophobic bullying. She also published several papers critically exploring the representation of same-sex parenting in psychological research - exploring themes of sameness and difference, the rhetoric of pseudoscience and constructions of lesbians as parents in psychological literature from 1886 to 2006.

After completing her PhD at Loughborough University, Clarke worked with Dr Carole Burgoyne and Professor Janet Reibstein, as a Research Fellow at the University of Exeter. The project - funded by the Lord Chancellor's Department - focused on money management in first time heterosexual marriage.

She joined the University of the West of England as a lecturer in Social Psychology in 2003. Currently Clarke is a Professor of Qualitative Psychology at the University of the West England, Bristol. Her research and teaching is centered around qualitative methods, queer psychology, human sexuality and gender studies.

== Selected works ==
=== Books ===
- Virginia Braun and Victoria Clarke. (2021). Thematic Analysis: A Practical Guide. Sage.
- Collecting qualitative data: A practical guide to textual, media and virtual techniques (2017, Cambridge University Press) - co-edited with Virginia Braun and Debra Gray.
- Successful qualitative research: A practical guide for beginners (2013, Sage) - with Virginia Braun.
- Lesbian, gay, bisexual, trans and queer psychology: An introduction (2010, Cambridge University Press) - with Sonja Ellis, Elizabeth Peel and Damien Riggs.
- Out in Psychology: Lesbian, gay, bisexual, trans and queer perspectives (2007, Wiley) - co-edited with Elizabeth Peel.
- British lesbian, gay, and bisexual psychologies: Theory, research and practice (2007, Routledge) - co-edited with Elizabeth Peel and Jack Drescher.

=== Selected journal entries and book chapters ===
- Using thematic analysis in psychology
- Reflecting on reflexive thematic analysis
- Feminist qualitative methods and methodologies in psychology: A review and reflection
- Using thematic analysis in counselling and psychotherapy research: A critical reflection
- Thematic analysis
- Innovations in qualitative methods
- Reflecting on qualitative research, feminist methodologies and feminist psychology: In conversation with Virginia Braun and Victoria Clarke
- (Mis)conceptualising themes, thematic analysis, and other problems with Fugard and Potts' (2015) sample-size tool for thematic analysis

== Research and scholarship ==
=== Qualitative research and thematic analysis ===
Clarke's main area of focus is qualitative research and particularly the reflexive approach to thematic analysis she has developed with Professor Virginia Braun at The University of Auckland. The 2006 paper in which they originally outlined their approach has over 360,000 Google Scholar citations and according to Google Scholar is the most cited academic paper published in 2006. An open access version is available from the University of the West of England Research Repository. Braun and Clarke have a thematic analysis website at The University of Auckland. This includes an extensive reading list, FAQs and links to their lectures on thematic analysis on YouTube. They have written numerous chapters, editorials, commentaries and encyclopedia entries on thematic analysis.

=== Areas of expertise ===
- Qualitative methods
- Thematic analysis
- Story completion
- Qualitative surveys
- Lesbian, gay, bisexual, trans and queer+ (LGBTQ) psychology
- Feminist psychology
- Human sexuality
- Same-sex parenting
- LGBT issues in higher education
- Voluntary childlessness
- Embryo donation for family building

== Awards and achievements ==
- American Psychological Association Division 44 Award for the Best Book in Lesbian, Gay, and/or Bisexual Psychology for 2007 (August 2007).
- British Psychological Society Book Award (Textbook) 2013 (September 2013).
- Association of Women in Psychology Distinguished Publication Award 2014 (August 2014).
