= Jean Taylor (disambiguation) =

Jean Taylor (born 1944) is an American mathematician.

Jean Taylor may also refer to:

- Jean Shinglewood Taylor (1913–2005), British author and a former chairman of the Family Planning Association
- Jean Taylor (swimmer), Scottish swimmer

== See also ==
- Jeanne Taylor (1912–1992), American painter and graphic designer
- Gene Taylor (disambiguation)
