= Creative participation =

Social sciences term

Creative participation is a term used in social sciences to describe the position of the observer towards the observed. Creative participation - originally a Lucien Lévy-Bruhl term from the 1920s for analysing social relations of cultural groupings, modified and revived by the German ethnologist V. Dahlheimer- rewrites the traditional participant observation approach and leaves more room for non-materialistic cognition. Dynamic movements which can not be measured from disconnected or relative viewpoints can be captured by means of feelings. Verification of data through creative participation is possible through practical conception only and can at best be validated by empirical means. Creative participation seeks to counteract classical problems in social science like i.e. rigid defense of theory, personal ambition, and weight of tradition which can lead to social and personal fragmentation.

In consumer psychology creative participation is defined as consumers' co-creation of novel and valuable products, services, ideas, consumption experiences with firms during their purchase or consumption process. According to "need for uniqueness"- theory, one of consumers' motivations for creative participation may come from their need for unique products. When consumers need to acquire the symbol of distinct self by unique products, they are driven to create.

Creative participation is also used as an educational training method. It can breakdown barriers between participants (and agencies), and encourage creative problem-solving, and the building of positive relationships.

In the political world creative participation presents the theory and practice of innovative forms of political participation, i.e. citizens cooperate in public action to achieve a common good.

== See also ==
- Fieldwork
- Muringa vila
- Participant Observation
- Participatory Action Research
- Qualitative research
- Educational psychology
- Grounded theory
- Person-centered ethnography
- Clinical Ethnography
- Naturalistic observation
- Unobtrusive measures

== Literature ==
- J. E. Bood in: The Law of Social Participation. The American Journal of Sociology, Vol. 27, No.1 (Jul., 1921), pp. 22–53
- Xu Lan in: Acta Psychologica Sinica 2007 39 (02): 343-354 ISSN 0439-755X CN: 11-1911/B
- Dr. V. Dahlheimer in: Die verwobene Kultur der Zukunft . Ethnologische Verständniswege für dynamische Metalanguage-Systeme, 2007. DDC-Notation 306 [DDC22ger]
- Creative Participation: Responsibility-Taking in the Political World, Paradigm Publishers, 2009, ISBN 978-1-59451-718-1
- David Bohm. On Dialogue. Routledge, London, 1996, ISBN 0-415-14911-8
