= Using Thematic Analysis in Psychology =

2006 psychology paper

Using Thematic Analysis in Psychology is a seminal psychology paper on thematic analysis by Virginia Braun and Victoria Clarke published in 2006 in Qualitative Research in Psychology. The paper's approach to thematic analysis has been widely cited in psychology and other disciplines.

A 2025 analysis by Nature placed the article as third most-cited paper of the 21st century, with over 230,000 citations.
