= Muringa vila =

Development project in Kerala, India

Muringa vila (Malayalam: 'the place of the muringa tree') is an international development project in Kovalam, Kerala, India, for sustainable building and income structures for the local participants. Structured after the concept of creative participation Muringa Vila integrates vital interests of its cultural creative participants as well as environmental and spiritual aspects, providing housing and income through self-created business as well as pursuing a sustainable local infrastructure.

The project was founded by a local fisherman and a German ethnologist in 2005 with the goal of finding practical solutions for problems of the indigenous society of this particular place which are created by a changing global environment, i.e., depleted oceans (as a source of income for the fishermen), gentrification of the village, emigration, educational deficits, immediate environmental threats, the take over of the beaches by tourism.

== In literature ==
- Dr. V. Dahlheimer in: Die verwobene Kultur der Zukunft . Ethnologische Verständniswege für dynamische Metalanguage-Systeme, 2007. DDC-Notation 306 [DDC22ger]
- Creative Participation: Responsibility-Taking in the Political World, Paradigm Publishers, 2009, ISBN 978-1-59451-718-1
- Paul H. Ray and Sherry Ruth Anderson, "The Cultural Creatives". New York: Harmony Books, 2000. ISBN 0-609-60467-8
