= Eugene Taylor =

Eugene Taylor may refer to:

- Eugene H. Taylor (1853–1924), of architectural firm Josselyn & Taylor
- Eugene Taylor (psychologist) (1946–2013), historian of psychology
- Eugene Van Taylor (born 1953), American soccer goalkeeper

== See also ==
- Gene Taylor (disambiguation)
