= Gene Taylor =

Gene Taylor may refer to:

- Gene Taylor (American football) (born 1962), wide receiver
- Gene Taylor (athletic director) (born 1957), NCAA Division I athletic director
- Gene Taylor (Mississippi politician) (born 1953), U.S. representative from Mississippi
- Gene Taylor (Missouri politician) (1928–1998), U.S. representative from Missouri
- Gene Taylor (pianist) (1952–2021), American pianist
- Gene Taylor (bassist) (1929–2001), American jazz musician
- Gene Taylor (TV and radio personality) (1947–2001), American comedian, TV and radio host and writer

== See also ==
- Eugene Taylor (disambiguation)
- Jean Taylor (disambiguation)
