= Practitioner–scholar model =

Educational model

The practitioner–scholar model is an advanced educational and operational model that is focused on practical application of scholarly knowledge. It was initially developed to train clinical psychologists but has since been adapted by other specialty programs such as business, public health, and law.

== Model ==
=== Creation ===
In 1973, a new clinical psychology training model was proposed at the historic Vail Conference on Professional Training in Psychology in Vail, Colorado—the practitioner-scholar model—providing yet another path of training for those primarily interested in clinical practice. Prior to this, in 1949, a ground breaking conference was held in Boulder, Colorado, endorsing a model of study for clinicians that to this day has dominated clinical programs at most University based institutions: the scientist–practitioner model, designed to provide a rigorous grounding in research methods and a breadth of exposure to clinical psychology. Before this, research scientists had dominated the field of psychological work, and this second, new model, known as the 'Vail' model, called for more practitioner-oriented course work.

=== Features ===
Several features differentiate the practitioner-scholar model from the other two (scientist-practitioner & clinical-scientist models):

- Training in this model is more strongly focused on clinical practice than either of the other two.
- Many (but not all) of these training programs grant a Psy.D. degree rather than a Ph.D. or Ed.D.
- Admissions criteria may place more of an emphasis on personal qualities of the applicants or clinically related work experience.
- Accepts a much larger number of students than the typical Ph.D. degree.
- These programs are typically housed in a greater variety of institutional settings than are research scientist or scientist-practitioner programs.

Like scientist-practitioner training, practitioner-scholar training is characterized by core courses in both basic and applied psychology, supervision during extensive clinical experience, and research consumption. Both require predoctoral internships that are usually full-time appointments in universities, medical centers, community mental health centers, or hospitals.

== See also ==
- Participant observation
- Qualitative research
