= David Shakow =

American psychologist (1901–1981)

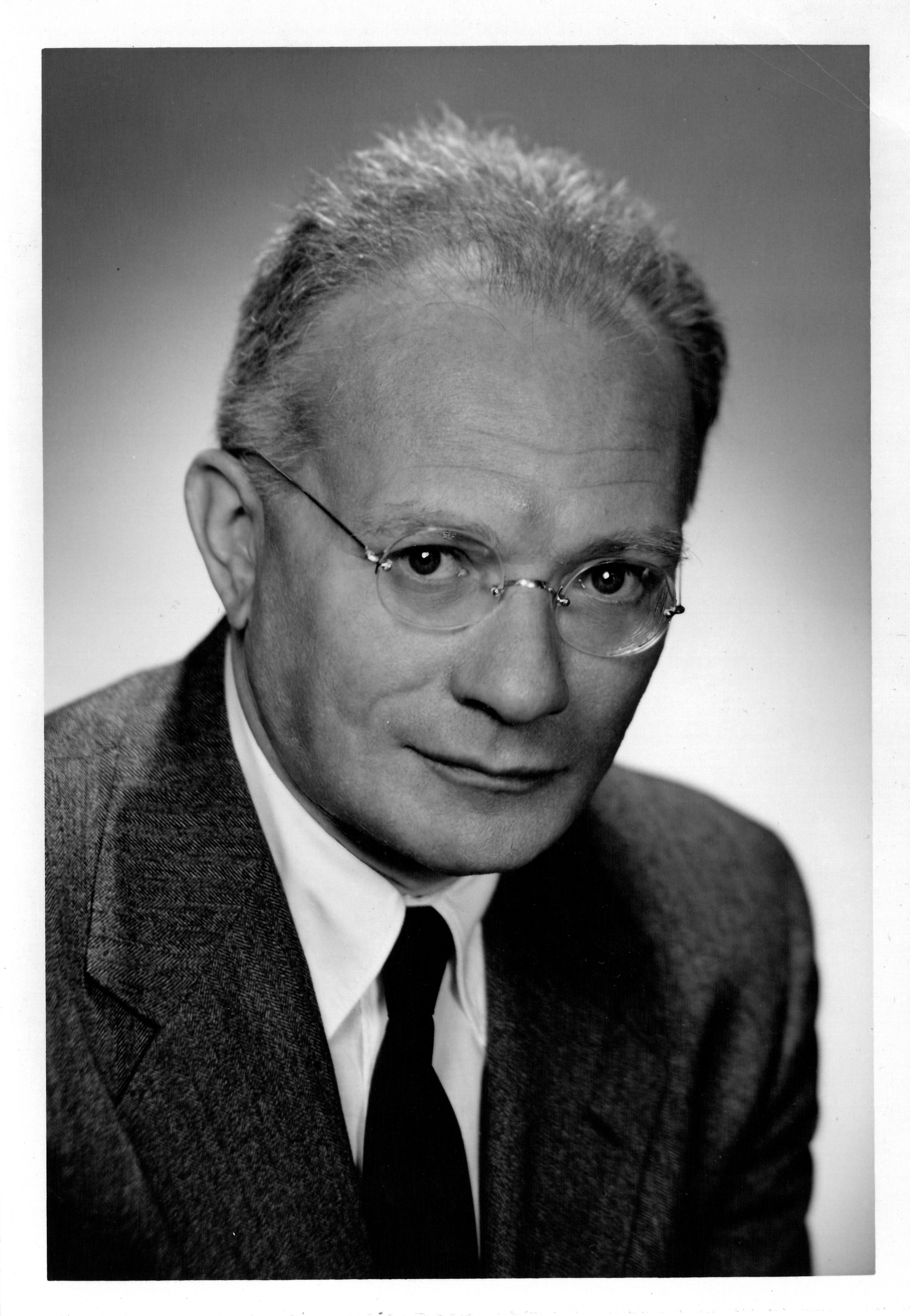
- Born: January 2, 1901; New York City, United States
- Died: 26 February 1981 (aged 80); Washington, D.C., US
- Education: Psychology
- Alma mater: Harvard University
- Known for: Study and development of schizophrenia, Developing scientist-practitioner model template of conducting research
- Spouse: Sophie Harap
- Children: 3
- Scientific career
- Fields: Psychology, Psychopathology, Clinical Psychology
- Workplaces: Worcester State Hospital, Clinical Center of the National Institutes of Health
- Thesis: The Nature of Deterioration in Schizophrenic Conditions

David Shakow (1901–1981) was an American psychologist. He is perhaps best known for his development of the Scientist-Practitioner Model (or Boulder Model) of graduate training for clinical psychologists, adopted by the American Psychological Association in 1949.

He also did pioneering research in schizophrenia, especially focusing on how deterioration and deficit results in the loss of normal functioning. His work helped to humanize those with schizophrenia, which was then seen largely as dangerous and untreatable. He is also known in the field for creating one of the first U.S. clinical psychology internship programs while he was at Worcester State Hospital.

== Biography ==
=== Early life and education ===
David Shakow was born in New York City on January 2, 1901, to his father Abraham Chaikowitz (changed to Shakow upon his arrival to the U.S.), and his mother Eva Leventhal. Abraham and Eva Shakow immigrated from Russia to Manhattan's Lower East Side where they raised their Jewish - based family. During adolescence, Shakow strayed from Jewish tradition and deterred from a career in business. During this time, he was introduced to the Madison House. The Madison House is a settlement for immigrants that is well known for encouraging education in those who spend time there. His stay at the Madison House introduced him to influences such as Freud, Jung, and James, which inspired Shakow's interest in psychopathology. He began his college education at Harvard University, where he received both his bachelor's degree and then master's degree in science. He then began his dissertation, but after marrying his wife Sophie and beginning a family, decided to begin work at Worcester State Hospital in 1926. He later finished his doctorate degree with a main focus on schizophrenia, which sparked his interest in his work at Worcester.

=== Career ===
In his time at Worcester State Hospital, he began one of the first clinical psychology internship programs. Shakow earned the position of chief psychologist as well as director of psychological research at the state hospital. It is here that he researched and wrote about the scientist-practitioner model. In 1948, he accepted a position as a psychology professor at the University of Illinois in the College of Medicine, and also did additional work at the University of Chicago in the Department of Psychology, where he taught for several years before moving on to a career in research. Shakow influenced the creation of NIMH Laboratory of Psychology where he was granted the position of chief in 1954. Here he focused on research and continued on to oversee over 500 articles. Shakow retired in 1966, but remained on staff as a senior research psychologist to conduct more research, articles, and memoirs, until he died of a heart attack at 80 years old in February 1981. He was survived by his wife, three children, and nine grandchildren.

== Major contributions ==
=== The Scientist-Practitioner Model ===
David Shakow was chief psychologist at the Worcester State Hospital, as well as a member of the Committee on the Training of Clinical Psychologists. His extensive schizophrenia research at the Worcester State Hospital helped him to develop what we know as the Boulder Model, or the Scientist-Practitioner Model. It aims to guide students in graduate programs to develop a foundation of research methodology, field work, and scientific practice through engagement to shape and improve their future work in the field of clinical psychology. This remains today to be the prominent model of training for clinical psychologists. Through this training and clinical experience, future mental health professionals would also have the chance to develop the understanding of the synergy between research and clinical practice as well as develop what Shakow coined "therapeutic attitude". He described this idea of therapeutic attitude as the psychologist having a caring mind-set and an appreciation for the patient as an individual human being rather than as a manipulated object. This idea is also still prominent today and is considered to be relevant for successful research outcomes.

=== Furthering the clinical psychology field ===
Fifty years after its conception, the Clinical Psychology field was ambiguously defined because of limiting the profession to one setting and because of the lack of standardization of training and teachings. Shakow developed further the clinical psychology field as a profession by specifying goals and functions of the field, training, and by creating relationships with allied professors (p. 211). He suggested having clinical psychology students individually selecting and organizing their coursework and training without any group support and had to be constantly defending and protecting his work. By rejecting definitions that were too narrow, which limited the clinician to just research, but too broad, which would make the field get diluted with other fields, and from his experience in working in medical psychiatric fields, he formalized what clinical psychologists are to diagnose, research, and do therapy as part of their profession.

==== Program for training clinical psychologists ====
Before 1946, there was only implicit agreement of what a clinical psychologist student should study in order to prepare themselves for practicing clinical psychology because universities were neither offering the same classes nor covering the same materials across the classes. Internships for getting experience in the field were not standardized, nor were clinical psychology students given a uniform title in which they would be recognized in as they worked as interns.

Shakow's role on the training was to standardize and systematize the training students had to go through as part of his defining what clinical psychologist were to do as part of their profession. He developed a clinical internship-training program model that was inspired from his experience in the mental psychiatric facilities and was to be the model for other institutions to use in the future. From his internship experience and work at the WSH giving him the opportunity to influence more than one hundred psychology interns, who were active participants of the clinical and the research aspects of the professional activities at the hospital, Shakow was able to implement an official standardization of the internship program, where the students would complete certain requirements in a certain order in order for them to become accredited and competent clinical psychologists. At the WSH, he implemented that clinical psychologist students at the end of their training, should be able to diagnose, do research, and perform therapy. The four-year training program stressed the setting up of goals as a rough guide for the students to see the expectations and for them to be aware of what is involved in the program and prepare them for their careers as clinical psychologists. This program was the working document for the Boulder Conference's discussion on how to define the field of clinical psychology.

=== Schizophrenia research ===
While Shakow was at Worcester he began to study schizophrenia. Shakow studied several different ways of measuring deterioration and deficits in abilities to function. He compared verbal and manual reaction times and associations in people with schizophrenia compared to normal subjects. Shakow found that deterioration occurs at the reflexive level, meaning it can be reversed. Deficits are defined as irreversible damage, which is found to occur at the cognitive and perceptual levels as a result of Shakow's research. Shakow promoted a new view on schizophrenia. By showing that those with schizophrenia were still human and were not untreatable or dangerous allowed for a different kind of care for the mentally ill. Shakow's dissertation The Nature of Deterioration of Schizophrenia was recognized as a classic study of schizophrenia.

Because of his work and contributions to the science and practice in the field of Clinical Psychology, the American Psychological Association established the David Shakow Early Career Award for Distinguished Scientific Contributions to Clinical Psychology, which is an award voted on and given by the Division 12 Board of Directors of the APA, called the Society of Clinical Psychology, to individuals who have received a doctorate within the past seven years who have contributed to the science of clinical psychology, both in science and practice. The award winner receives up to $500 to travel to the year's APA convention.

=== Awards and recognition ===
Shakow eventually moved to NIMH where he developed the laboratory and created special sections to study schizophrenia, childhood development, aging, perception, and even personality. Due to his work he was awarded the Distinguished Scientific Contribution Award and the Distinguished Professional Contribution Award. Over the years, Shakow also completed biographies on Herman Ebbinghaus and Kurt Goldstein for the American Journal of Psychology.

This is a list of the awards, memberships, and recognitions Shakow was awarded with throughout his lifetime, in order of his receiving them:

- Honorary Membership in the Washington Psychoanalytic Society (1955)
- Distinguished Contribution Award, Division of Clinical Psychology, APA (1959)
- Collier Lecturer, University of Rochester (1960)
- Stanley R. Dean Research Award in Schizophrenia (1963)
- Helen Sargent Memorial Award, Menninger Foundation (1965)
- Honorary Fellowship in the American Psychiatric Association (1969)
- Doctor of Science, Honoris Causa, University of Rochester (1971)
- 3rd Annual Seymour D. Vestermark Memorial Award (1971)
- National Association of Mental Health Special Recognition Award at the 25th Anniversary of NIMH (1971)
- First Award for Notable Contribution to Psychopathology, Section of Experimental Psychopathology, Division of Clinical Psychology, APA (1971)
- Salmon Medal for Distinguished Service in Psychiatry (1971)
- Honorary Membership in the American Psychoanalytic Association (1976)
- American Psychological Association's (APA) Distinguished Scientific Award (1975) and its Distinguished Professional Contribution Award (1976)
- First Rapaport-Klein Memorial Lecturer (1974)
- NIH Scientist Emeritus (1974-1975)

== Works ==
=== Journals on Schizophrenia ===
- Shakow, D (1962). "Segmental set: A theory of the formal psychological deficit in schizophrenia". Arch Gen Psychiatry. 6 (1): 1–17. doi:10.1001/archpsyc.1962.01710190003001. PMID 13911157.
- Shakow, D (1963). "Psychological deficit in schizophrenia". Behavioral Science. 8 (4): 275–305. doi:10.1002/bs.3830080402. PMID 4867203.
- Rodnick, Shakow (1940). "Set in the schizophrenic as measured by a composite reaction time index". American Journal of Psychiatry. 97 (1): 214–225. doi:10.1176/ajp.97.1.214.
- Huston, P. E.; Shakow, D.; Riggs, L. A. (1937). "Studies of motor function in schizophrenia: II. reaction time". The Journal of General Psychology. 16 (1): 39–82. doi:10.1080/00221309.1937.9917940.
- Crowmwell, R. L.; Rosenthal, D.; Shakow, D.; Zahn, T. P. (1961). "Reaction time, locus of control, choice behavior, and descriptions of parental behavior in schizophrenic and normal subjects". Journal of Personality. 29 (4): 363–379. doi:10.1111/j.1467-6494.1961.tb01668.x. PMID 13882327.
- Zahn, T. P.; Rosenthal, D.; Shakow, D. (1963). "Effects of irregular preparatory intervals on reaction time in schizophrenia". The Journal of Abnormal and Social Psychology. 67 (1): 44–52. doi:10.1037/h0049269. PMID 14003031.
- Shakow, D. (1946). The nature of deterioration in schizophrenic conditions" Nervous & Mental Disorders Monograph Series 70, vii - 88.
- Shakow, D.; Huston, P. E. (1936). "Studies of motor function in schizophrenia: I. speed of tapping". The Journal of General Psychology. 15 (1): 63–106. doi:10.1080/00221309.1936.9917905.
- Shakow, D (1971). "Some observations on the psychology (and some fewer, on the biology) of schizophrenia". Journal of Nervous & Mental Disease. 153 (5): 300–316. doi:10.1097/00005053-197111000-00002. PMID 5145494. S2CID 43730373.
- Shakow, D.; Huston, P. E. (1949). "Learning capacity in schizophrenia". American Journal of Psychiatry. 105 (12): 881–888. doi:10.1176/ajp.105.12.881. PMID 18127073.
- Rosenthal, D.; Lawlor, W. G.; Zahn, T. P.; Shakow, D. (1960). "The relationship of some aspects of mental set to degree of schizophrenic disorganization". Journal of Personality. 28 (1): 26–38. doi:10.1111/j.1467-6494.1960.tb01600.x. PMID 14439046.
- Shakow, D (1980). "Kent-Rosanoff association and its implications for segmental set theory". Schizophrenia Bulletin. 6 (4): 676–685. doi:10.1093/schbul/6.4.676. PMID 7444396.
- Rosenthal, Zahn; Shakow (1963). "Verbal versus manual reaction time in schizophrenic and normal subjects". Quarterly Journal of Experimental Psychology. 15 (3): 214–216. doi:10.1080/17470216308416327. S2CID 145302695.
- Shakow, D (1972). "The Worcester State Hospital research on schizophrenia". Journal of Abnormal Psychology. 80 (1): 67–110. doi:10.1037/h0033412. PMID 4558097.
- Shakow, D (1969). "On Doing Research in Schizophrenia". Arch Gen Psychiatry. 20 (6): 618–642. doi:10.1001/archpsyc.1969.01740180002002. PMID 4890811.
- Shakow, D (1977). "Schizophrenia: Selected papers". Psychological Issues. 10 (2 Mono 38): 1–354.
- Altman, C. H.; Shakow, D. (1937). "A comparison of the performance of matched groups of schizophrenic patients, normal subjects, and delinquent subjects on some aspects of the Stanford Binet". Journal of Educational Psychology. 28 (7): 519–529. doi:10.1037/h0060942.
- Hoskins, R. G.; Sleeper, F. H.; Shakow, D.; Jellinek, E. M.; Looney, M. J.; Erickson, M. H. (1933). "A cooperative research in schizophrenia". Archives of Neurology and Psychiatry. 30 (2): 388–401. doi:10.1001/archneurpsyc.1933.02240140152008.
- Shakow, D (1977). "Segmental set: The adaptive process in schizophrenia". American Psychologist. 32 (2): 129–139. doi:10.1037/0003-066x.32.2.129. PMID 618373.
- Rosenzweig, S.; SHakow, D. (1937). "Play technique in schizophrenia and other psychoses: II. An experimental study of schizophrenic constructions with play materials". American Journal of Orthopsychiatry. 7 (1): 36–47. doi:10.1111/j.1939-0025.1937.tb05558.x.
- Zahn, T. P.; Shakow, D.; Rosenthal, D. (1961). "Reaction time in schizophrenic and normal subjects as a function of preparatory and intertrial intervals". Journal of Nervous & Mental Disease. 133 (4): 283–287. doi:10.1097/00005053-196110000-00002. PMID 14009592. S2CID 6086158.
- Shakow, D.; McCormick, M. Y. (1965). "Mental set in schizophrenia studied in a discrimination reaction setting". Journal of Personality and Social Psychology. 1 (1): 88–95. doi:10.1037/h0021688. PMID 14328707.
- Shakow, D.; Rodnick, E. H.; Lebeaux, T. (1945). "A psychological study of a schizophrenic: exemplification of a method". The Journal of Abnormal and Social Psychology. 40 (2): 154–174. doi:10.1037/h0058941.

=== Other journals ===
- Hilgard, E. R.; Kelly, E. L.; Luckey, B.; Sanford, R. N.; Shaffer, L. F.; Shakow, D. (1947). "Recommended graduate training program in clinical psychology". American Psychologist. 2 (12): 539–558. doi:10.1037/h0058236. PMID 18917473.
- Shakow, D.; Rapaport, D. (1964). "The influence of Freud on American psychology". Psychological Issues. 4 (1): 1–243. PMID 14288801.
- Harris, A. J.; Shakow, D. (1937). "The clinical significance of numerical measures of scatter on the Stanford-Binet". Psychological Bulletin. 34 (3): 134–150. doi:10.1037/h0058420.
- Shakow, D (1960). "The recorded psychoanalytic interview as an objective approach to research in psychoanalysis". The Psychoanalytic Quarterly. 29: 82–97. doi:10.1080/21674086.1960.11926163. PMID 14445411.
- Shakow, D (1976). "What is clinical psychology?". American Psychologist. 31 (8): 553–560. doi:10.1037/0003-066x.31.8.553. PMID 1008338.
- Huston, P. E.; Shakow, D.; Erickson, M. H. (1934). "A study of hypnotically induced complexes by means of the luria technique". The Journal of General Psychology. 11 (1): 65–97. doi:10.1080/00221309.1934.9917817.
- Roe, A.; Shakow, D. (1942). "Intelligence in mental disorder". Annals of the New York Academy of Sciences. 42 (4): 361–490. doi:10.1111/j.1749-6632.1942.tb57064.x. S2CID 222073297.
- Shakow, D (1930). "Hermann Ebbinghaus". The American Journal of Psychology. 42 (4): 505–518. doi:10.2307/1414874. JSTOR 1414874.
- Shakow, D (1966). "Kurt Goldstein: 1878-1965". The American Journal of Psychology. 79 (1): 150–154.
- Shakow, D (1979). "The "Guinea Pig" Formboard: Its Construction and Some Learning Norms". The Journal of Genetic Psychology. 135 (2): 291–295. doi:10.1080/00221325.1979.10534083. PMID 528989.
- Shakow, D (1942). "The training of the clinical psychologist". Journal of Consulting Psychology. 6 (6): 277–288. doi:10.1037/h0059917.
- Shakow, D (1938). "An internship year for psychologists (with special reference to psychiatric hospitals)". Journal of Consulting Psychology. 2 (3): 73–76. doi:10.1037/h0055488.
- Shakow, D.; Millard, M. (1935). "A Psychometric Study of 150 Adult Delinquents". The Journal of Social Psychology. 6 (4): 437–457. doi:10.1080/00224545.1935.9919751.
- Millard, M.; Shakow, D. (1935). "A Note on Color-Blindness in Some Psychotic Groups". The Journal of Social Psychology. 6 (2): 252–256. doi:10.1080/00224545.1935.9921640.
- Huston, P. E.; Shakow, D. (1948). "Issue journal of personality". Journal of Personality. 17 (1): 52–74. doi:10.1111/j.1467-6494.1948.tb01194.x. PMID 18101181.
- Shakow, D.; Goldman, R. (1938). "The effect of age on the Stanford-Binet vocabulary score of adults". Journal of Educational Psychology. 29 (4): 241–256. doi:10.1037/h0062830.
- Shakow, D (1978). "Clinical psychology seen some 50 years later". American Psychologist. 33 (2): 148–158. doi:10.1037/0003-066x.33.2.148.
- Shakow, D (1965). "Seventeen years later: Clinical psychology in light of the 1947 Committee on Training in Clinical Psychology Report. *Shakow, D., Rosenzweig, S. (1940). The use of the tautophone ("verbal summator") as an auditory apperceptive test for the study of personality". Journal of Personality. 8 (3): 216–226. doi:10.1111/j.1467-6494.1940.tb02177.x. hdl:11858/00-001M-0000-002C-431A-5.
- Shakow, D (1980). "Kent-Rosanoff association and its implications for segmental set theory". Schizophrenia Bulletin. 6 (4): 676–685. doi:10.1093/schbul/6.4.676. PMID 7444396.
- Shakow, D (1949). "Psychology and psychiatry: A dialogue: Part I". American Journal of Orthopsychiatry. 19 (2): 191–208. doi:10.1111/j.1939-0025.1949.tb05142.x.
- Shakow, D.; Jellinek, E. (1965). "Composite index of the Kent-Rosanoff Free Association Test". Journal of Abnormal Psychology. 70 (6): 403–404. doi:10.1037/h0022749. PMID 5846423.
- Shakow, D (1930). "Hermann Ebbinghaus". The American Journal of Psychology. 42 (4): 505–518. doi:10.2307/1414874. JSTOR 1414874.

=== Books ===
- Shakow, D. (1901). Clinical psychology as science and profession. Chicago: Aldine Pub. Co.
- Shakow, D. (1979). Adaption in schizophrenia: the theory of segmental set. New York: John Wiley & Sons Canada, Limited.
- Shakow, D. & Rapaport, D. (1964). The influence of Freud on American psychology. Michigan: International Universities Press.
