= Person-centered ethnography =

Approach within psychological anthropology

Person-centered ethnography is an approach within psychological anthropology that draws on techniques and theories from psychiatry and psychoanalysis to understand how individuals relate to and interact with their sociocultural context. The term was first used by Robert I. Levy, a psychoanalytically trained psychiatrist, to describe his psychodynamically informed approach to interviewing during his anthropological fieldwork in Tahiti and Nepal.

A key distinction in person-centered interviewing is that between interviewees as informants and as respondents. As Levy and Hollan describe it,

There is a significant difference between asking a Tahitian interviewee something like "Please describe for me exactly how and why supercision (a penis-mutilating rite of passage) is done by Tahitians," and asking him "Can you tell me about your supercision?"..."Did it change your life in any way?" "How?" "What did you think and feel about it then?" "What do you think and feel about it now?"

The first question engages interviewees as typical ethnographic informants, asking them to describe features of their culture or social system; the latter questions ask much more directly about their own experiences, feelings, hopes, and desires, as well as changes in these over time. Not surprisingly, asking about these more intimate topics generally requires much longer acquaintance with an interviewee than do questions about more publicly available knowledge.

Levy and Hollan note that person-centered interviewing makes use of both modes and tacks back and forth between them; its difference from most methods of ethnographic interviewing lies in its emphasis on the latter and its concern with understanding how individuals relate to, experience, and understand their larger sociocultural context. Within these, major topics of interest typically include: the experience of the self, morality, the body, illness and healing, emotions, and family relationships.

Methodologically, person-centered interviewing also depends on a fair degree of experience in self-monitoring for transference and countertransference phenomena, as well as attention to elisions, avoidances, and gaps in interviewees' answers and attention to interviewees' emotional reactions during and outside the formal interview setting.

Person-centered interviewing comes out of a psychodynamically informed tradition within Culture and Personality studies and American psychological anthropology and shares a number of methodological and thematic concerns with clinical ethnography.

== Select bibliography ==
- Levy, Robert I. (1973) Tahitians: mind and experience in the Society Islands. Chicago: University of Chicago Press.
- Levy, Robert I. (1990) Mesocosm: the organization of a Hindu Newar city in Nepal. Berkeley, CA: University of California Press.
- Levy, Robert I. and Douglas Hollan (1998) "Person-Centered Interviewing and Observation in Anthropology." pp. 333–364 in Handbook of Methods in Cultural Anthropology, edited by H. R. Bernard. Walnut Creek, CA: Altamira Press.

== See also ==
- Clinical Ethnography
- Creative participation
- Educational psychology
- Naturalistic observation
- Scholar-practitioner model
- Qualitative research
