= Jeanne Taylor =

American painter (1912–1992)

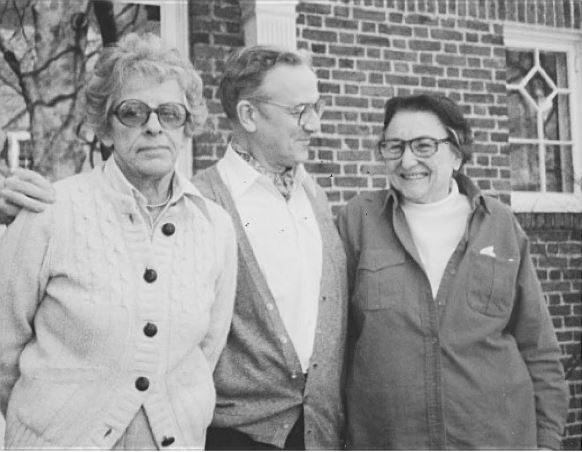
- Jeanne Taylor, Gérard Du Bois, and Cora Du Bois (1980)
- Born: December 1, 1912; Saint Paul, Minnesota
- Died: December 2, 1992 (aged 80); Cambridge, Massachusetts
- Education: University of Minnesota
- Alma mater: St. Paul School of Art
- Known for: Painter and graphic designer
- Style: Regionalism
- Partner: Cora Du Bois

Jeanne Taylor (December 1, 1912 – December 2, 1992) was an American regionalist style painter and graphic designer from Saint Paul, Minnesota.

== Early life and education ==
Jeanne Taylor was born in Saint Paul, Minnesota, on December 1, 1912. She attended the University of Minnesota, the St. Paul School of Art and the Art Students League of New York.

== Career ==
Taylor was a leader of the Regionalist movement in Minnesota, painting reassuring images of the local heartlands during the Great Depression. Her work is displayed in the Minnesota Historical Center. Exhibitions include: Minnesota State Fair, Minneapolis Institute of Arts, American University, Corcoran Gallery of Art, Baltimore Museum of Art, Pennsylvania Academy of the Fine Arts. Taylor's work may be found in the collection of the National Gallery of Art.

She was a supervisor for the Index of American Design during the Works Progress Administration (WPA) and a member of the Minnesota WPA Federal Art Project. In 1937, she received an honorable mention for her landscape presented at the Minnesota State Fair.

She moved to Ceylon for work with the Office of Strategic Services. Afterwards, Taylor worked in Graphic Design in New York City and was an art and shop teacher at the Little Red School House before retiring to Cambridge, Massachusetts.

== Personal life ==
In 1944, anthropologist Cora Du Bois moved to Ceylon to serve as chief of research and analysis for the Army's Southeast Asia Command. Taylor entered into a lesbian relationship with Du Bois and they lived together as a couple; and in the mid-1950s they visited Paul and Julia Child in Paris.

Du Bois's obituary in The New York Times referred to Taylor as "her longtime companion", and her Harvard Library biography says Taylor was "her companion" and they "enjoyed an active social life".

== Death ==
Jeanne Taylor, aged 80, died on December 2, 1992, in Cambridge, Massachusetts.
