= Celia Kitzinger and Sue Wilkinson =

British lesbian couple

Celia Kitzinger
- Born: England; 1956 (age 69–70)
- Occupation: University professor
- Known for: One half of first British lesbian couple to lobby for their marriage to be recognised by England
- Spouse: Sue Wilkinson

Sue Wilkinson
- Born: England; 1954 (age 71–72)
- Occupation: University professor
- Known for: One half of first British lesbian couple to lobby for their marriage to be recognised by England
- Spouse: Celia Kitzinger

Celia Kitzinger and Sue Wilkinson are a British lesbian couple who unsuccessfully sued to have their relationship recognised as a marriage in England. Both are university professors—Kitzinger in psychology and Wilkinson in gender studies—and they have published four books together.

After marrying in Vancouver, Canada, in 2003, the couple discovered on moving back to the UK that their relationship initially had no legal status. In 2004, the Civil Partnership Act allowed their marriage to become a civil partnership, but the couple sued for full legal recognition. In 2006, their bid was rejected by the High Court Family Division. The couple's marriage was eventually recognized on 13 March 2014, when the Marriage (Same Sex Couples) Act 2013 came into force.

== Celia Kitzinger ==
Kitzinger was born in 1956. She first came out as a lesbian at age 17, and was expelled from two schools as a result. At the time, lesbianism was still classified as a mental illness, and mental health providers tried to cure her of what they considered a "phase". These experiences motivated Kitzinger to pursue the study of psychology herself, as a way to challenge what she saw as the field's misunderstanding of lesbianism. In 1984, she met Sue Wilkinson while at a professional conference in Cardiff, and the pair began a relationship, eventually marrying in Vancouver in 2003.

Kitzinger is qualified as a chartered psychologist within the British Psychological Society (BPS), of which she was elected fellow in 1997. Throughout the 1990s, Kitzinger, Wilkinson, and others lobbied the BPS for a Lesbian and Gay Psychology Section, which was established in 1999 with Kitzinger as chair. The BPS awarded Kitzinger the 2016 Lifetime Achievement Award in recognition of her contributions to social justice and the psychology of sexualities. The BPS singled out Kitzinger's award-winning 1987 book The Social Construction of Lesbianism as particularly influential, as well as her work on language and social interaction, which won the 2008 BPS Qualitative Methods in Psychology Section Outstanding Research Award.

== Sue Wilkinson ==
Wilkinson was born in 1954 and became interested in psychology after working part-time for a psychologist neighbor. Wilkinson completed her undergraduate studies at the University of Leicester, graduating with a BSc degree in psychology. From there, she proceeded to earn a PhD specialising in gender issues, particularly regarding the role of women in psychology.

Wilkinson's first academic post was as a lecturer at the University of Liverpool; following this she took position as Head of the Psychology department at Coventry University. In 1991, she co-founded the journal Feminism & Psychology, becoming its first editor-in-chief.

After Coventry, Wilkinson accepted a research post at the University of Hull, then left this post to accept a visiting professorship at the University of Waikato. After this position in 1999, Wilkinson was granted a full professorship at Loughborough, having been associated with the university since 1994. Despite this, Wilkinson decided to accept a sabbatical between 2001 and 2002; she spent this year firstly working at the University of California, Santa Barbara, and then serving as a visiting scholar at the University of California, Los Angeles. The following year she took special leave to take chair as the Ruth Wynn Woodward Endowed Professor of Women's Studies at Simon Fraser University in British Columbia, Canada. Whilst in Canada, Kitzinger and Wilkinson decided to marry.

From 1994 to 2015, Wilkinson was on the faculty at Loughborough University In 2015, she accepted an honorary post at the University of York.

== Marriage status ==
Wilkinson v Kitzinger
- Court: High Court of Justice; Family Division
- Decided: July 31, 2006; 20 years ago
- Citations: [2006] EWHC 2022 (Fam) [2006] H.R.L.R. 36

Court membership
- Judge sitting: Potter P

The couple married in Yaletown, Vancouver, in August 2003, a few weeks after same-sex marriage became legal in British Columbia, where Wilkinson had been working as a visiting professor at Simon Fraser University. On their return to the UK, the couple discovered that their relationship had no legal status. Two years later, with the implementation of the Civil Partnership Act, the relationship was automatically converted to a civil partnership.

The couple sued for the recognition of their marriage, the trial beginning on 5 June 2006 before Sir Mark Potter, President of the Family Division. For an overseas marriage to be recognised in the UK, it must be shown that the marriage was legal, recognised in the country in which it was executed, and that nothing in the country's law restricted freedom to marry; Kitzinger and Wilkinson argued that their marriage fulfilled these requirements even though people could not legally enter into same-sex marriages in the UK. They rejected entering a civil partnership, believing them to be both symbolically and practically a lesser substitute, and asked the court to recognise their overseas marriage in the same way that it would recognise the marriage of an opposite-sex couple. They argued that a failure to do so breached their human rights under Articles 8 (right to respect for privacy and family life), 12 (right to marry) and 14 (prohibition of discrimination), taken together with Article 8 and/or 12 of the European Convention on Human Rights, which was incorporated into domestic UK law by the Human Rights Act 1998.

In a 21 September 2005 press release issued by Liberty, the British civil rights organisation which supported their case, Kitzinger and Wilkinson said:

This is fundamentally about equality. We want our marriage to be recognised as a marriage - just like any other marriage made in Canada. It is insulting and discriminatory to be offered a civil partnership instead. Civil partnerships are an important step forward for same-sex couples, but they are not enough. We want full equality in marriage.

James Welch, Legal Director at Liberty, said:

Our clients entered into a legal marriage in Canada. It is a matter of fairness and equality that they should be treated the same way as any other couple who marries abroad: their marriage should be recognised here. They shouldn't have to settle for the second-best option of a civil partnership.

The High Court announced its judgment on 31 July 2006, finding that the marriage would continue to be recognised as a civil partnership in England and Wales, but not as a marriage. In handing down his ruling, the President of the Family Division, Sir Mark Potter, gave as his reason that "Abiding single sex relationships are in no way inferior, nor does English Law suggest that they are by according them recognition under the name of civil partnership" and that marriage was an "age-old institution" which, he suggested, was by "longstanding definition and acceptance" a relationship between a man and a woman. He described this as an "insurmountable hurdle" to the couple's case. While agreeing that they were discriminated against by the Civil Partnership Act 2004, he considered that "To the extent that by reason of that distinction it discriminates against same-sex partners, such discrimination has a legitimate aim, is reasonable and proportionate, and falls within the margin of appreciation accorded to Convention States." The Attorney General, as Second Respondent, sought £25,000 in costs.

== Aftermath of case ==
The couple announced their intention to appeal against the decision of the High Court, but later abandoned this due to lack of funds. After losing the case, Kitzinger and Wilkinson stopped wearing their wedding rings in protest. Kitzinger stated that they lost hope that their marriage would be legally recognized in their lifetime.

On 13 March 2014, their overseas marriage was recognised by the Government as a legal marriage as the Marriage (Same Sex Couples) Act 2013 came into force. The couple celebrated with a private retreat and a bottle of champagne, putting their wedding rings back on at midnight.

== Books ==
=== Kitzinger ===
- Kitzinger, Celia (1987). The Social Construction of Lesbianism. London; Newbury Park, Calif: SAGE Publications Limited. ISBN 0-8039-8116-3.
- Kitzinger, Celia; Perkins, Rachel (1993). Changing Our Minds: Lesbian Feminism and Psychology. New York London: New York University Press. ISBN 0-8147-4645-4.
- Thomas, Alison M.; Kitzinger, Celia (1997). Sexual Harassment: Contemporary Feminist Perspectives. Buckingham: Open Univ. Press. ISBN 0-335-19580-6.
- Coyle, Adrian; Kitzinger, Celia (2002). Lesbian and Gay Psychology: New Perspectives. Oxford: Wiley-Blackwell. ISBN 978-1-4051-0222-3.

=== Wilkinson ===
- Wilkinson, Sue (1986). Feminist Social Psychology. Milton Keynes (Buckinghamshire); Open University Press (Philadelphia). ISBN 0-335-15329-1.

=== Joint publications ===
- Wilkinson, Sue; Kitzinger, Celia (1993). Heterosexuality: A Feminism and Psychology Reader. London Newbury Park, Calif.: SAGE Publications Limited. ISBN 0-8039-8822-2.
- Wilkinson, Sue; Kitzinger, Celia (1994). Women and Health: Feminist Perspectives. s.l: Routledge. ISBN 0-7484-0148-2.
- Wilkinson, Sue; Kitzinger, Celia (1996). Representing the Other. London; Thousand Oaks, Calif: SAGE Publications Limited. ISBN 0-7619-5228-4.
- Wilkinson, Sue; Kitzinger, Celia (1996). Feminism and Discourse: Psychological Perspectives. London: SAGE Publications Limited. ISBN 0-8039-7801-4.

== See also ==
- Same-sex marriage in the United Kingdom
- Obergefell v. Hodges, the American court case that legalized same-sex marriage in the United States
