= Scientist–practitioner model =

Training model for psychology graduate programs

The scientist–practitioner model, also called the Boulder Model, is a training model for graduate programmes that provide applied psychologists with a foundation in research and scientific practice. It was initially developed to guide clinical psychology graduate programmes accredited by the American Psychological Association (APA).

David Shakow created the first version of the model and introduced it to the academic community. From the years of 1941 until 1949, Shakow presented the model to a series of committees where the core tenets developed further. The model changed minimally from its original version because it was received extremely well at all of the conferences. At the Boulder Conference of 1949, this model of training for clinical graduate programs was proposed. Here, it received accreditation by the psychological community and the American Psychological Association.

The goal of the scientist–practitioner model is to increase scientific growth within clinical psychology in the United States. It calls for graduate programs to engage and develop psychologists' background in psychological theory, field work, and research methodology. The scientist–practitioner model urges clinicians to allow empirical research to influence their applied practice; while simultaneously, allowing their experiences during applied practice to shape their future research questions. Therefore, continuously advancing, refining and perfecting the scientific paradigms of the field.

== History ==
After World War I, returning veterans reported decreased life satisfaction after serving. This was partly due to the lack of clinical psychologists available to treat victims of "shell-shock" (now known as post traumatic stress disorder). At this time, psychology was primarily an academic discipline, with just a few thousand practicing clinicians. The Second World War also influenced the development of the Boulder Model by fueling the growth of clinical psychology. Psychiatrists in the US military requested help from psychologists in efforts to treat "psychological and psychiatric casualties the war was producing" (p. 426).

In order to increase life satisfaction for World War II veterans the federal government increased funding to clinical psychology graduate programs and created the GI Bill. As a result, after the war Psychology graduate programs flourished with applicants and resources. The field's increasing popularity called for action, by the academic community, to establish universal standards for educating graduate psychologists. Although the model has not been as prominent in industrial/organizational (I/O) psychology, Campbell acknowledged that the model later influenced I/O psychology (see page 447).

== Development ==
David Shakow is largely responsible for the ideas and developments of the Boulder Model. On May 3, 1941, while he was chief psychologist at Worcester State Hospital, Shakow drafted his first training plan to educate clinical psychology graduate students during a Conference at The New York Psychiatric Institute, now referred to as Shakow's 1941 American Association for Applied Psychology Report. In the report, Shakow outlined a 4-year education track:

- Year 1: establish a strong foundation in psychology and other applied sciences
- Year 2: learn therapeutic principles and practices needed to treat patients
- Year 3: internship, gain supervised field experience
- Year 4: complete research dissertation.

Overall, the report aimed to help clinical graduate students perfect their abilities to complete diagnoses, therapy, and scientific research. The report was endorsed and recommended its review to the American Association for Applied Psychology (AAAP). Later in the year, the AAAP accepted the recommendation and planned a conference to address training guidelines for graduate programs. The following year the Penn State Conference was held with 3 subcommittees containing representatives from educational institutions, health establishments, and business/industry. These measures were taken to ensure that the final model was not biased towards Shakow's profession, although only minute changes were made to his original model.

In 1944, a conference was held at the Vineland training school to reexamine Shakow's report. The American Association for Applied Psychology integrated into the American Psychological Association. Meanwhile, increased demand for professional psychologists prompted the United States Public Health Service (USPHS) and the Veteran Administrative (VA) to increase funding for clinical psychology graduate programs. With more resources at hand, APA president, Carl Rogers asked David Shakow to chair The Committee on Training in Clinical Psychology (CTCP). This committee's primarily responsibility was to decide upon an effective model for education at the graduate level.

Shakow's revised report was published in the Journal of Consulting Psychology in 1945 titled Graduate Internship Training in Psychology. Shakow presented his published report to the CTCP and received minimal critique. So, the committee submitted his report to the APA for approval. The APA endorsed Shakow's training model and published it in the American Psychologist declared as the set agenda for an upcoming conference discussing training methods in clinical graduate programs. By December, the report was known as "The Shakow Report".

The CTCP members made site visits and evaluations of universities who had clinical graduate programs. At a joint meeting of the USPHS and the CTCP, a six-week conference was suggested to discuss reported inconsistencies in current clinical training programs. The conference would be sponsored by the APA and would be granted $40,000 in financial backing by the USPHS.

In January 1949, a planning meeting for the upcoming conference was held in Chicago by members of the CTCP and representatives from the APA board of directors. Here, details including the conference's name, attendants, and location were decided upon. The planning committee of 1949, agreed to name the conference, The Boulder Conference on Graduate Education in Clinical Psychology, and invited participants from a variety of disciplines. The conference would be held at the University of Colorado at Boulder, thereby allowing participants to attend the proceeding annual meeting of the APA scheduled in Denver.

== Boulder Conference ==
The Boulder Conference met from August 20 till September 3, 1949. A total of 73 committee members attended the conference representing fields of academic and applied psychology, medicine, and educational disciplines. This conference's goal was to agree upon a standard training plan for clinical psychologists. The Shakow Report was on the agenda, and was received with unanimous support. Due to this consensus, the Shakow report is now referred to as the Boulder Model.

This model aims to teach clinical graduate students to adhere to the scientific method when executing their applied practices. The model states that in order to master these techniques, graduate students need to attend seminars and lectures that strengthen their background in psychology, complete monitored field work, and receive research training. Ultimately, most psychologists specialize in either research academia or applied practice, but this model argues that having sufficient knowledge in the entire field will enhance a psychologist's ability to perform their specialty.

== Criticisms ==
Despite the Boulder Model's widespread adoption by graduate psychology programs, it was met with mounting criticism after its installment in 1949. The debate over the Boulder Model's value centers around an array of criticisms:

- That the Boulder Model lacks validity, meaning that the Boulder Model does not actually help graduate students become better scientists and practitioners.
- That the Boulder Model monopolizes the energies of students, demanding that they spend a large portion of their graduate careers studying research methods that they will not use in professional practice, and depriving them of intensive and extensive formal training and apprenticeship in the art and craft of psychotherapy.
- That the Boulder Model promotes a view of humans and their suffering that has been simplified to the point at which it does not yield significantly clinically useful guidance to determine practice. Further, the tendency to focus on symptoms and discrete patient characteristics promotes an instrumentalizing view of people in distress that filters into the clinical work of students.
- That diversity of clinical approaches is restricted as programs emphasize those methods that can be easily measured.
- That the version of the scientific method taught in Boulder Model programs stresses data gathering techniques over critical thinking skills and theory-building, setting it apart from the so-called hard sciences in its uncritical approach to empiricism.
- That publication history tends to eclipse clinical sensitivity and depth in the evaluation and promotion of students.
- That the Boulder Model promotes short-cycle research over longitudinal and more intricate studies that cannot be completed within the timeframe of a training cycle. Thus, that minority of students who do follow a more research-oriented career path are not trained in, or trained to respect, qualitative, longer-term or more complex studies of human psychology.
- In short, that the skills needed for practice in clinical psychology versus those needed for research are not compatible. .

Criticisms continued to accumulate until 1965 at the Chicago Conference. Here, it was recommended that clinical graduate programs restructure their training methods for students who wanted to focus their careers on applied practices. This idea was reinforced by the Clark Committee of 1967. The committee developed the practitioner-oriented model for clinical graduate programs, and presented it at the Vail Conference in 1973. This model was accepted readily to coexist with the Boulder Model, which is still used by many psychology graduate programs today.

== Core tenets ==
Core tenets of the today's model included in the current Boulder Model:

- Giving psychological assessment, testing, and intervention in accordance with scientifically based protocols
- Accessing and integrating scientific findings to make informed healthcare decisions for patients
- Questioning and testing hypotheses that are relevant to current healthcare;
- Building and maintaining effective cross-disciplinary relationships with professionals in other fields
- Research-based training and support to other health professions in the process of providing psychological care;
- Contribute to practice-based research and development to improve the quality of health care.
