= Robert I. Levy =

Robert I. Levy (1924 – 29 August 2003, Asolo, Veneto, Italy) was an American psychiatrist and anthropologist known for his fieldwork in Tahiti and Nepal and on the cross-cultural study of emotions. Though he did not receive a formal degree in anthropology, he spent most of his adult life conducting anthropological fieldwork or teaching in departments of anthropology. In developing his approach to anthropology, he credited his cousin, the anthropologist Roy Rappaport, and Gregory Bateson (another famous anthropologist who never received a graduate degree in anthropology).

Robert Levy initially trained as a psychoanalytic psychiatrist and had a private practice in psychiatry for several years before he became involved in an ethnographic research project in the Society Islands (Tahiti), organized by anthropologist Douglas Oliver. He did field work in the Society Islands for twenty-six months, first during a pilot study in July and August 1961, then for two years between July 1962 and June 1964. He published this research in a number of articles and the book Tahitians: mind and experience in the Society Islands (1973), which was selected as a finalist for the National Book Awards in 1974. In this seminal work both in the ethnography of Polynesian societies and in psychological anthropology, he first demonstrated what he called person-centered ethnography, an approach to fieldwork that drew on his training as a clinical psychiatrist to understand individual feelings, experience, and motivation within a given cultural setting.

From 1964 to 1966 he was a senior scholar in the Institute of Advanced Projects at the East–West Center and research associate in anthropology at Bishop Museum, Honolulu. In 1969 he took a faculty position as professor in the newly established anthropology department at the University of California, San Diego, where he taught for many years.

His other major fieldwork site was the Newar city of Bhaktapur in Nepal.

After retiring from UCSD in 1991, he was appointed research professor of anthropology at University of North Carolina at Chapel Hill, and research professor of anthropology at Duke University.

He received a number of awards for his scholarly activities. He was elected Fellow of the American Academy of Arts and Sciences in 1996. In 2001 the Society for Psychological Anthropology honored him with its Lifetime Achievement Award.

He died while on holiday in the Italian town of Asolo, from complications of Parkinson's disease. A number of articles relating to his research, as well as a brief memorial written by his wife, were published in a special volume of Ethos (December 2005, Vol. 33, No. 4), the journal of the Society for Psychological anthropology.

His students included the anthropologists Douglas Hollan, Paula Levin, Steven Parish.

== Select bibliography ==
- Levy, Robert I. (1971) "The community functions of Tahitian male transvestites." Anthropological Quarterly 44:12-21.
- Levy, Robert I. (1973) Tahitians: mind and experience in the Society Islands. Chicago: University of Chicago Press.
- Levy, Robert I. 1984. "Emotion, knowing, and culture." pp. 214–237 in Culture Theory: essays on mind, self, and emotion., edited by R. Shweder and R. LeVine. Cambridge, UK: Cambridge University Press.
- Levy, Robert I. 1990. Mesocosm: the organization of a Hindu Newar city in Nepal. Berkeley, CA: University of California Press.
- Levy, Robert I. and Douglas Hollan. 1998. "Person-Centered Interviewing and Observation in Anthropology." pp. 333–364 in Handbook of Methods in Cultural Anthropology, edited by H. R. Bernard. Walnut Creek, CA: Altamira Press.
