= Member check =

Research technique

In qualitative research, a member check, also known as informant feedback or respondent validation, is a technique used by researchers to help improve the accuracy, credibility, validity, and transferability (also known as applicability, internal validity, or fittingness) of a study. There are many subcategories of members checks, including: narrative accuracy checks, interpretive validity, descriptive validity, theoretical validity, and evaluative validity. In many member checks, the interpretation and report (or a portion of it) is given to members of the sample (informants) in order to check the authenticity of the work. Their comments serve as a check on the viability of the interpretation.

Member checking can be done during the interview process, at the conclusion of the study, or both to increase the credibility and validity (statistics) of a qualitative study. The interviewer should strive to build rapport with the interviewee in order to obtain honest and open responses. During an interview, the researcher will restate or summarize information and then question the participant to determine accuracy. Member checks completed after a study are completed by sharing all of the findings with the participants involved. This allows participants to critically analyze the findings and comment on them. The participants either affirm that the summaries reflect their views, feelings, and experiences, or that they do not reflect these experiences. If the participants affirm the accuracy and completeness, then the study is said to have credibility. These member checks are not without fault, but serve to decrease the incidence of incorrect data and the incorrect interpretation of data. The overall goal of this process is to provide findings that are authentic, original and reliable.

== Positive aspects of member-checking ==
Member checking provides an opportunity to understand and determine what the author intended to do through their actions. It gives them the ability to correct errors and challenge what are perceived as wrong interpretations. Member checking provides the opportunity to volunteer additional information which may be stimulated by the playing back process. Gets respondent on the record with their reports. Provides people that respond the opportunity to assess adequacy of data and preliminary results as well as to confirm particular aspects of the data. The ability to summarize the preliminary findings. The major problem with member checking however is that it relies on the assumption that there is a fixed truth of reality that can be accounted for by a researcher and can be confirmed by a respondent, which may not be true. In fact, member checks are not consistent with the philosophy of non positivistic qualitative research methods. See positivism for more information on philosophy of approach.

== Interviewing and member checking ==
There are two interview styles to promote discussion between interviewees and the interviewers during member checks. The first, Confrontation Style is only effective when there is a trusted, warm, and open relationship between the interviewer and the interviewee. This style promotes discussion empowering the interviewee to have confidence to "fight back" when his/her opinion is questioned. The second, Dialogue and Power, focuses on the inherent power struggle between the interviewer and the interviewee. Interviewers must be aware of this imbalance of power and promote discussion from the interviewee by valuing opinions and reinforcing equal collaboration between the two.

In an informal sense, member checks are carried out verbally throughout the conduct of fieldwork. The researcher constantly checks his or her understanding of the phenomenon by utilizing techniques such as paraphrasing and summarization for clarification. It is best to ask permission to visit the participant again at the time of the unstructured interview. Interviews are used as a way for the respondent to express their emotions and thoughts about their experiences and allow the interviewer to have a better understanding of a situation.

When the member check procedure is used in a sample of people who were not the original participants in the study, the procedure can be used to assess transferability. If the people who were not the original participants do not agree with the information, then the findings can be said to be biased or not transferable since transferability is the process of being able to apply the findings from one study to others in similar situations. A question to ask is whether the findings "ring true" in others' experiences.

It is critical to use member checking in qualitative research studies because these types of studies often involve interpretation. Thus, without allowing participants to validate the accuracy of their findings, one-sidedness will become a major concern. Since the most important issue in evaluating the rigor of qualitative research is trustworthiness, using the strategy of member checks, (along with other techniques such as independent audit, prolonged engagement, triangulation, peer debriefing), is critical to minimizing distortion. Prolonged engagement aids in the ability to detect and account for distortions that might be in the data. It also helps to become oriented to the situation so content is appreciated and the researcher builds trust. In general, member checks are a useful function in research, especially when there are questions about the adequacy of understanding based on limited time of exposure. Thus, a member check can serve to counterbalance concerns about whether engagement was sufficiently prolonged.

== Advantages and disadvantages of member checks ==
=== Advantages ===
The greatest advantage in a member check is that the researcher can verify the entirety and completeness of the findings, which is a measurable tool of the accuracy of the findings.

Other Advantages:

- Provides an opportunity to understand and assess what the participant intended to do through his or her actions.
- Gives participants opportunity to correct errors and challenge what are perceived as wrong interpretations.
- Provides the opportunity to volunteer additional information which may be stimulated by the playing back process.
- Gets respondent on the record with his or her reports.
- Provides an opportunity to summarize preliminary findings.
- Member checks can be useful in action research projects, where researchers work with participants on a continuing basis to help with change.
- It lessens the risk of participants reporting at a later date that the researcher misunderstood their contributions or claiming investigative error.
- Enables an assessment of what the participant intended by making exact comments or taking specific actions.
- Shows high credibility and face validity.
- Prevents personal biases from being included within the quantitative research study.
- Prevents false information from being presented as reliable research.

=== Disadvantages ===
There are multiple disadvantages related to member checks that may occur throughout the process.

- Research findings cannot be easily conveyed to the participant. This is most commonly the case in addiction and criminal research. Additionally, findings may be difficult to understand.
- Member check exercises can make extensive demands on the participants' time.
- Sometimes the content of transcripts and the research topic can be exploitative and/or distressing.
- Research participants may refuse to participate in member check, especially if an extended period of time has elapsed since research study.
- Participants may tell the researcher what they believe the researcher wants to hear.
- Member checking relies on the assumption that there is a fixed truth of reality that can be accounted for by a researcher and confirmed by a respondent.
- Members may relay accounts during an interview that they later regret or see differently. Members may deny such stories and want them removed from the data.
- Members may not be in the best position to check the data. They may forget what they said or the manner in which a story was told
- Different members may have different views of the same data.
- It requires skills and experience from the researcher and can be expensive and time-consuming.
- Member checks (respondent validation) are part of a process of error reduction, which also generates further original data, which, in turn, require interpretation, rather than as a straightforward check on validity.
- The very subjectivity of the inquiry leads to difficulties in establishing the reliability and validity of the approaches and information.
- Its scope is limited due to the in-depth, comprehensive data gathering approaches required.

== Objections to member checks ==
Many writers establish internal validity – truthfulness and representation of the reality of the participants – by showing that they have carried out a ‘member check’ as Lincoln and Guba (1985) suggest. However, some researchers disagree with the use of a member check. Many researchers have noted that when the essence of the participants' experiences are similar, their stories represent social reality. Accordingly, phenomenology (science) is defined as a philosophy or method of inquiry based on the premise that reality consists of objects and events as they are perceived or understood in human consciousness and not of anything independent of human consciousness.

In qualitative research, phenomenological methods are used to learn and construct the meaning of the human experience through intensive dialogue with persons who are living the experience. The researcher's goal is to explain the meaning of the experience to the participant. This is achieved through a dialogic process, which is more than a simple interview. Therefore, in their opinion, a member check can adversely transform the data through the process of analysis and writing. Phenomenologists believe each individual has his/her own unique perspective, inhabits a social world, and recognizes others’ reality to some extent. They believe that for an account to have validity, its readers will have grasped not only the essence of the phenomenon but also understood something of the human condition they have in common with the participants-–intersubjective understanding.

== Member check considerations ==
Member checks by research participants are increasingly recommended in qualitative research. There are differences, however, in qualitative research that suggests member checks may need to be approached with caution. Although member checking has been used for verification of the results, it is not always a true verification strategy. Many methodologists caution against using member check as verification by defining what participants say to be correct because it may actually pose a threat to the validity instead. This is due to results of studies being combined, made neutral, and abstracted from other participants as well as investigators wanting to be more responsive to their participants and restrain some of their results. Ultimately this causes the researcher's study to be invalid. Many consider member checking to be the best method of establishing credibility, but one of the main drawbacks is the way in which the researcher views the research as being intended to generalize the findings. This may clash with the participant's view that their account is specific and solely their experience. Due to the different views regarding interpretation of data, member checks may be better suited as being identified as a tool for error reduction, rather than a verification protocol.

Member checks can be used as a technique to evaluate the problems with the study process such as practical, theoretical, representational, and moral flaws to ensure the honesty of the research procedures. The process of a member check also is important in revealing missing information that should be addressed before concluding the study. This is a step of reevaluation within a study that allows for researchers to implement changes and conduct further interviews in areas where a study is weak. However, the responses received from participants may not always be accurate and should be carefully reviewed by researchers.

It is important for researchers to review responses in order to avoid altering sound data. Participants in a study may have knowledge of incomplete or incorrect information that leads to misinformed responses. Likewise, they may also respond falsely in order to avoid social judgment or societal views on the subject, despite anonymity. Participants’ responses may also stem from myth-based knowledge or delusional thinking (Douglas, 1976). When hypotheses are formed, researchers often have predictions on the outcome; therefore, it is vital that researchers avoid their own biases to data. Avoidance of bias can be aided by having separate researchers review the member check responses rather than by those who conducted the interviews. There are no clear-cut means of clearly avoiding incorrect participant feedback or researcher bias from tainting gathered research. However, if researchers can minimize these factors they can strengthen the external validity of their research.

Although member checks are considered very beneficial to credibility of the study, there is not a lot of information or understanding on how member checks should be performed. In recent studies, two methods have been identified. The first is to send the transcripts or summaries are sent to the original participants to be confirmed. The second uses a member check group session with each group member being shown a summary of the analysis. Regardless of the method used to peer review or member check research it must be done to ensure quality research and improve upon the research being performed before it is submitted for publication and considered as a reliable study.

== See also ==
- Analytic induction
- Content analysis
- Focus group
- Interview
- Online research communities
- Participatory action research
- Qualitative research
- Sensemaking
- Qualitative research
- Qualitative Study
- Assessing quality in qualitative research
