= Abram Kardiner =

Psychiatrist and psychoanalytic therapist

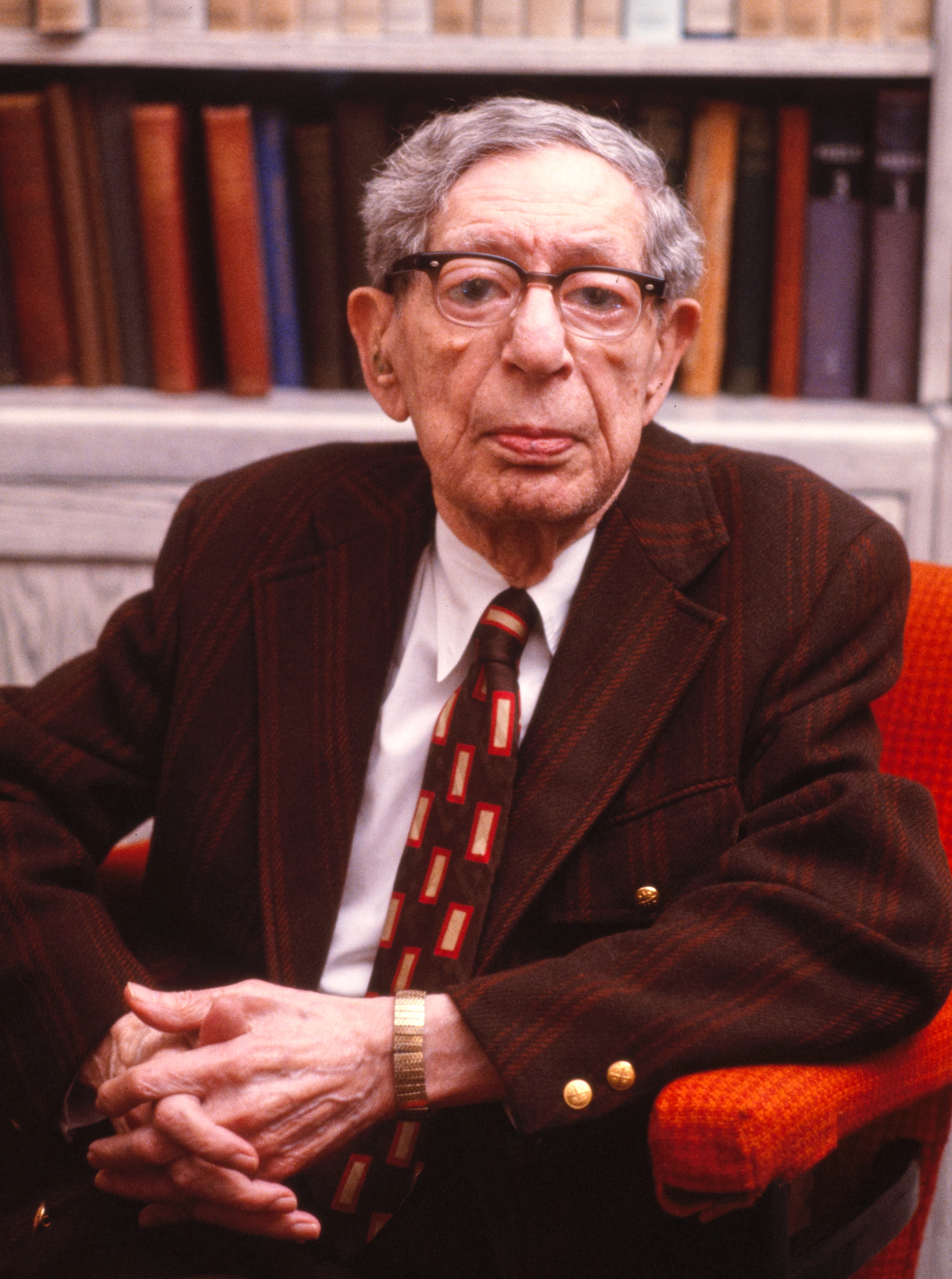
Kardiner in 1980

Abram Kardiner (17 August 1891, New York City – 20 July 1981, Connecticut) was an American psychiatrist (Cornell Medical School, 1917) and psychoanalytic therapist.

An active publisher of academic research, he co-founded the Psychoanalytic and Psychosomatic Clinic for Training and Research in the Department of Psychiatry at Columbia University in New York City (known today as the Psychoanalytic Clinic for Training and Research). Kardiner was deeply interested in cross-cultural diagnosis and the psychoanalytic study of culture. While teaching at Columbia, he developed a course on the application of psychoanalysis to the study of culture and worked closely with anthropologists throughout his career.

He is most famously known for authoring The Traumatic Neuroses of War (1941), which is considered by many modern clinicians as a seminal work on combat related trauma. The second edition was updated in 1947 and retitled as War Stress and Neurotic Illness.

Based on work conducted at No. 81 Veterans' Bureau Hospital in the Bronx, New York City, in the 1920s and early 1930s, his study was one of the first to make explicit connections between peacetime and war trauma, and many of the symptoms he described in patients would later be utilized in the 1980 definition of post-traumatic stress disorder by the American Psychiatric Association.

Another book he authored is The Individual and his Society: the Psychodynamics of Primitive Social Organization (with the collaboration of Ralph Linton).
