= Psychological anthropology =

Interdisciplinary subfield of anthropology

Psychological anthropology is an interdisciplinary subfield of anthropology that studies the interaction of cultural and mental processes. This subfield tends to focus on ways in which humans' development and enculturation within a particular cultural group with its own history, language, practices, and conceptual categories that shape processes of human cognition, emotion, perception, motivation, and mental health. It also examines how the understanding of cognition, emotion, motivation, and similar psychological processes inform or constrain our models of cultural and social processes. Each school within psychological anthropology has its own approach.

== History ==
Psychological anthropology emerged during the 20th century as a subfield of anthropology. The formal development of the sub-discipline is often attributed to anthropologist Franz Boas and some of his students, among whom were Margaret Mead, Ruth Benedict, and Edward Sapir. Boas, a founding influence of cultural anthropology, is one of the most important figures in the history of American anthropology. Like many of his contemporaries, Boas was intrigued by questions about the human mind. He likely read and engaged with psychoanalytical theory, such as that of Sigmund Freud, whose work was considered both controversial and groundbreaking during that era.

Wilhelm Wundt was a German psychologist and pioneer in folk psychology. His objectives were to form psychological explanations using the reports of ethnologists. He made different contracting stages such as the 'totemic' stage, the 'age of heroes and gods', and the 'enlightened age of humanity'. Unlike most, Wundt believed that the mind of both 'primitive' and civilised groups had equivalent learning capabilities but that they simply used that capacity in different ways.

Though intimately connected in many ways, the fields of anthropology and psychology have remained two distinct disciplines, in part because of their differing methodologies and disciplinary objectives. Where anthropology was traditionally geared towards historical and evolutionary trends, what psychology concerned itself with was more ahistorical and acultural in nature. Psychoanalysis joined the two fields together.

In 1972 Francis L. K. Hsu suggested that the field of culture and personality be renamed 'psychological anthropology'. Hsu considered the original title old fashioned given that many anthropologists regarded personality and culture as the same, or in need of better explanations. During the 1970s and 1980s, psychological anthropology began to shift its focus towards the study of human behaviour in a natural setting.

== Schools ==
=== Psychoanalytic anthropology ===
This school is based upon the insights of Sigmund Freud and other psychoanalysts as applied to social and cultural phenomena. Adherents of this approach often assumed that techniques of child-rearing shaped adult personality and that cultural symbols (including myths, dreams, and rituals) could be interpreted using psychoanalytical theories and techniques. The latter included interviewing techniques based on clinical interviewing, the use of projective tests such as the TAT and the Rorschach, and a tendency towards including case studies of individual interviewees in their ethnographies. A major example of this approach was the Six Cultures Study under John and Beatrice Whiting in Harvard's Department of Social Relations. This study examined child-rearing in six very different cultures (New England Baptist community; a Philippine barrio; an Okinawan village; an Indian village in Mexico; a northern Indian caste group; and a rural tribal group in Kenya).

Some practitioners look specifically at mental illness cross-culturally (George Devereux) or at the ways in which social processes such as the oppression of ethnic minorities affect mental health (Abram Kardiner), while others focus on the ways in which cultural symbols or social institutions provide defense mechanisms (Melford Spiro) or otherwise alleviate psychological conflicts (Gananath Obeyesekere). Some have also examined the cross-cultural applicability of psychoanalytic concepts such as the Oedipus complex (Melford Spiro).

Others who might be considered part of this school are a number of scholars who, although psychoanalysts, conducted fieldwork (Erich Fromm) or used psychoanalytic techniques to analyze materials gathered by anthropologists (Sigmund Freud, Erik Erikson, Géza Róheim).

Because many American social scientists during the first two-thirds of the 20th century had at least a passing familiarity with psychoanalytic theory, it is hard to determine precisely which ones should be considered primarily as psychoanalytic anthropologists. Many anthropologists who studied personality (Cora Du Bois, Clyde Kluckhohn, Geoffrey Gorer) drew heavily on psychoanalysis; most members of the "culture and personality school" of psychological anthropology did so.

In recent years, psychoanalytic and more broadly psychodynamic theory continues to influence some psychological anthropologists (such as Gilbert Herdt, Douglas Hollan, and Robert LeVine) and have contributed significantly to such approaches as person-centered ethnography and clinical ethnography. It thus may make more sense to consider psychoanalytic anthropology since the latter part of the 20th century as more a style or a set of research agendas that cut across several other approaches within anthropology.

See also: Robert I. Levy, Ari Kiev. Jeannette Mageo.

=== Culture and personality ===
Personality is the overall characteristics that a person possesses. All of these characteristics are acquired within a culture. However, when a person changes his or her culture, his or her personality automatically changes because the person learns to follow the norms and values of the new culture, and this, in turn, influences the individual's personal characteristics.

==== Configurationalist approach ====
This approach describes a culture as a personality; that is, interpretation of experiences, guided by symbolic structure, creates personality which is "copied" into the larger culture. Leading figures include Ruth Benedict, A. Irving Hallowell, and Margaret Mead.

==== Basic and modal personality ====
Major figures include John Whiting and Beatrice Whiting, Cora Du Bois, and Florence Kluckhohn.

==== National character ====
Leading figures include sociologist Alex Inkeles and anthropologist Clyde Kluckhohn.

=== Ethnopsychology ===
Major figures: Vincent Crapanzano, Georges Devereux, Tobie Nathan, Catherine Lutz, Michelle Zimbalist Rosaldo, Renato Rosaldo, Charles Nuckolls, Bradd Shore, and Dorinne K. Kondo

=== Cognitive anthropology ===
Cognitive anthropology takes a number of methodological approaches, but generally draws on the insights of cognitive science in its model of the mind. A basic premise is that people think with the aid of schemas, units of culturally shared knowledge that are hypothesized to be represented in the brain as networks of neural connections. This entails certain properties of cultural models, and may explain both part of the observed inertia of cultural models (people's assumptions about the way the world works are hard to change) and patterns of association.

Roy D'Andrade (1995) sees the history of cognitive anthropology proper as divisible into four phases. The first began in the 1950s with the explicit formulation of culture as knowledge by anthropologists such as Ward Goodenough and Anthony Wallace. From the late 1950s through the mid-1960s, attention focused on categorization, componential analysis (a technique borrowed from structuralist linguistics), and native or folk systems of knowledge (ethnoscience e.g., ethnobotany, ethnolinguistics and so on), as well as discoveries in patterns of color naming by Brent Berlin and Paul Kay. During the 1950s and 1960s, most of the work in cognitive anthropology was carried out at Yale, University of Pennsylvania, Stanford, Berkeley, University of California, Irvine, and the Harvard Department of Social Relations. The third phase looked at types of categories (Eleanor Rosch) and cultural models, drawing on schema theory, linguistic work on metaphor (George Lakoff, Mark Johnson). The current phase, beginning in the 1990s, has seen more focus on the problem of how cultural models are shared and distributed, as well as on motivation, with significant work taking place at UC San Diego, UCLA, UC Berkeley, University of Connecticut, and Australian National University, among others.

Currently, different cognitive anthropologists are concerned with how groups of individuals are able to coordinate activities and "thinking" (Edwin Hutchins); with the distribution of cultural models (who knows what, and how people access knowledge within a culture: Dorothy Holland, A. Kimball Romney, Dan Sperber, Marc Swartz); with conflicting models within a culture (Naomi Quinn, Holly Mathews); or the ways in which cultural models are internalized and come to motivate behavior (Roy D'Andrade, Naomi Quinn, Charles Nuckolls, Bradd Shore, Claudia Strauss). Some cognitive anthropologists continue work on ethnoscience (Scott Atran), most notably in collaborative field projects with cognitive and social psychologists on culturally universal versus culturally particular models of human categorization and inference and how these mental models hinder or help social adaptations to natural environments. Others focus on methodological issues such as how to identify cultural models. Related work in cognitive linguistics and semantics also carries forward research on the Sapir–Whorf hypothesis and looks at the relationship between language and thought (Maurice Bloch, John Lucy, Anna Wierzbicka).

=== Psychiatric anthropology ===
While not forming a school in the sense of having a particular methodological approach, a number of prominent psychological anthropologists have addressed significant attention to the interaction of culture and mental health or mental illness (see Janis H. Jenkins), ranging through the description and analysis of culture-bound syndromes (Pow-Meng Yap, Ronald Simons, Charles Hughes); the relationship between cultural values or culturally mediated experiences and the development or expression of mental illness (among immigrants, for instance more particularly) (Thomas Csordas, George Devereux, Robert Edgerton, Sue Estroff, Arthur Kleinman, Janis H. Jenkins, Roberto Beneduce, Robert Lemelson, Theresa O'Nell, Marvin Opler); to the training of mental health practitioners and the cultural construction of mental health as a profession (Charles W. Nuckolls, Tanya Luhrmann), and more recently what Janis H. Jenkins refers to the cultural creation of a "pharmaceutical self" in a globalizing world (Jenkins 2011). Recent research focuses on specific relationships between History, conscience, cultural Self and suffering (Roberto Beneduce, Etnopsichiatria. Sofferenza mentale e alterità fra Storia, dominio e cultura, 2007). Some of these have been primarily trained as psychiatrists rather than anthropologists: Abram Kardiner, Arthur Kleinman, Robert I. Levy, Roberto Beneduce, Roland Littlewood. Further research has been done on genetic predisposition, family's contribution to the genesis of psychopathology, and the contribution of environmental factors such as tropical diseases, natural catastrophes, and occupational hazards.

== Today ==
During most of the history of modern anthropology (with the possible exception of the 1930s through the 1950s, when it was an influential approach within American social thought), psychological anthropology has been a relatively small though productive subfield. D'Andrade, for instance, estimates that the core group of scholars engaged in active research in cognitive anthropology (one of the smaller sub-subfields), have numbered some 30 anthropologists and linguists, with the total number of scholars identifying with this subfield likely being less than 200 at any one time.

At present, relatively few universities have active graduate training programs in psychological anthropology. These include:

- Centre Georges Devreux, Paris 8 University
- Australian National University - Linguistics and Applied Linguistics Program
- Brunel University, West London - MSc program in psychological and psychiatric anthropology
- Case Western Reserve University - MA, PhD in cultural anthropology
- Duke University - Cultural Anthropology
- Emory University - Anthropology
- London School of Economics - Anthropology
- University of Bergen, Norway - Social Anthropology
- University of California, Berkeley - Anthropology and Linguistics
- University of California, Irvine - Anthropology
- University of California, Los Angeles - Anthropology
- University of California, San Diego - Anthropology and Cognitive Science
- University of Chicago - Human Development
- University of Connecticut - Anthropology
- University of North Carolina, Chapel Hill - Anthropology
- University College London - MSc in Medical Anthropology, MSc in Biosocial Medical Anthropology, PhD in Anthropology

Also, social medicine and cross-cultural/transcultural psychiatry programs at:

- Harvard - Department of Global Health & Social Medicine
- McGill - Division of Social and Transcultural Psychiatry
- Pontificia Universidad Catolica de Valparaiso - Master in Ethnopsychology
- Università degli Studi di Trieste - Department of Ethnopsychology
- Queen Mary University of London - MSc Mental Health: Cultural Psychology and Psychiatry
- University College London - Division of Psychiatry (Critical, Social, Cultural Psychiatry within Epidemiology and Applied Clinical Research Department)

== See also ==
- Cognitive anthropology
- Cognitive science
- Cultural psychology
- Egocentrism
- Enculturation
- Development of religion
- Harvard Department of Social Relations
- Social psychology
- Symbolic interactionism

== Bibliography ==
=== Selected historical works and textbooks ===
- Bock, Philip K.; Leavitt, Stephen C. (2019). Rethinking Psychological Anthropology: A Critical History (3rd ed.). Long Grove, Illinois: Waveland Press. ISBN 978-1-4786-3728-8.
- D'Andrade, Roy G. (1995). The Development of Cognitive Anthropology. Cambridge, UK: Cambridge University Press.
- Hsu, Francis L. K., ed. (1972). Psychological Anthropology. Cambridge: Schenkman Publishing Company, Inc.
- Wilhelm Max Wundt (1917). Völkerpsychologie: Eine Untersuchung der Entwicklungsgesetze von Sprache, Mythus und Sitte, Leipzig; 2002 reprint: ISBN 978-0-543-77838-3.

=== Selected theoretical works in psychological anthropology ===
- Bateson, Gregory (1956). Steps to an Ecology of Mind. New York: Ballantine Books.
- Hallowell, A. Irving (1955). Culture and Experience. doi:10.9783/9781512816600. ISBN 9781512816600.
- Kilborne, Benjamin and L. L. Langness, eds. (1987). Culture and Human Nature: Theoretical papers of Melford E. Spiro. Chicago: University of Chicago Press.
- Nuckolls, Charles W. (1996). The Cultural Dialectics of Knowledge and Desire. Madison: University of Wisconsin Press.
- Nuckolls, Charles W. (1998). Culture: A Problem that Cannot be Solved. Madison: University of Wisconsin Press.
- Quinn, N. (2005). Quinn, Naomi (ed.). Finding Culture in Talk. doi:10.1007/978-1-137-05871-3. ISBN 978-1-4039-6915-6.
- Regnier, Denis; Astuti, Rita (2015). "Introduction: Taking up the cognitive challenge". Social Anthropology. 23 (2): 131–134. doi:10.1111/1469-8676.12117.
- Sapir, Edward (1956). Culture, Language, and Personality: selected essays. Edited by D. G. Mandelbaum. Berkeley, CA: University of California Press.
- Schwartz, Theodore, Geoffrey M. White, and Catherine A. Lutz, eds. (1992). New Directions in Psychological Anthropology. Cambridge, UK: Cambridge University Press.
- Shore, Bradd (1995). Culture in Mind: cognition, culture, and the problem of meaning. New York: Oxford University Press.
- Shweder, Richard A. and Robert A. LeVine, eds. (1984). Culture Theory: Essays on mind, self, and emotion. Cambridge, UK: Cambridge University Press.
- Strauss, Claudia and Naomi Quinn (1997). A Cognitive Theory of Cultural Meaning. Cambridge, UK: Cambridge University Press.
- Wierzbicka, Anna (1999). Emotions across Languages and Cultures. doi:10.1017/CBO9780511521256. ISBN 9780511521256.

=== Selected ethnographic works in psychological anthropology ===
- Benedict, Ruth (1946)- The Chrysanthemum and the Sword: Patterns of Japanese Culture. Boston: Houghton Mifflin Company.
- Boddy, Janice (1989). Wombs and alien spirits: Women, men, and the Zar cult in northern Sudan. Univ of Wisconsin Press.
- Briggs, Jean (1970). Never in Anger: Portrait of an Eskimo family. Cambridge, Massachusetts: Harvard University Press.
- Crapanzano, Vincent (1973). The Hamadsha: A Study in Moroccan Ethnopsychiatry. University of California Pr.
- Crapanzano, Vincent (1985). Tuhami: portrait of a Moroccan. University of Chicago Press.
- Du Bois, Cora Alice (1960) The people of Alor; a social-psychological study of an East Indian island. With analyses by Abram Kardiner and Emil Oberholzer. New York: Harper.
- Herdt, Gilbert (1981). Guardians of the Flutes. Chicago: University of Chicago Press.
- Lambek, Michael (1993). Knowledge and Practice in Mayotte. doi:10.3138/9781442676534. ISBN 9781442676534.
- Levy, Robert I. (1973). Tahitians: mind and experience in the Society Islands. Chicago: University of Chicago Press.
- Lutz, Catherine A. (1988). Unnatural Emotions. doi:10.7208/chicago/9780226219783.001.0001. ISBN 9780226497228.
- Rosaldo, Michelle Zimbalist (1980). Knowledge and passion: Ilongot notions of self and social life. doi:10.1017/CBO9780511621833. ISBN 9780511621833.
- Scheper-Hughes, Nancy (1979). Saints, Scholars, and Schizophrenics: mental illness in rural Ireland. Berkeley, CA: University of California Press.
- Swartz, Marc J. (1991). The Way the World Is: cultural processes and social relations among the Swahili of Mombasa. Berkeley: University of California Press.

=== Selected works in psychiatric anthropology ===
- Beneduce, Roberto (2008). "Undocumented bodies, burned identities: Refugees, sans papiers, harraga — when things fall apart". Social Science Information. 47 (4): 505–527. doi:10.1177/0539018408096444. S2CID 144205691.
- Beneduce, Roberto; Martelli, Pompeo (2005). "Politics of Healing and Politics of Culture: Ethnopsychiatry, Identities and Migration". Transcultural Psychiatry. 42 (3): 367–393. doi:10.1177/1363461505055621. PMID 16268234. S2CID 44926869.
- Beneduce, Roberto (2007). Etnopsichiatria. Sofferenza mentale e alterità fra Storia, dominio e cultura, Roma: Carocci.
- Jenkins, Janis H. and Robert J. Barrett (2004). Schizophrenia, Culture, and Subjectivity: The Edge of Experience. New York: Cambridge University Press.
- Jenkins, Janis H. (2011). Pharmaceutical Self: The Global Shaping of Experience in an Age of Psychopharmacology. Santa Fe, NM: School of Advanced Research.
- Lézé, Samuel (2014). "Anthropology of mental illness", in Andrew Scull (ed.), Cultural Sociology of Mental Illness : an A-to-Z Guide. Sage, pp. 31–32
- Kardiner, Abram, with the collaboration of Ralph Linton, Cora Du Bois and James West (pseud.) (1945). The psychological frontiers of society. New York: Columbia University Press.
- Kleinman, Arthur (1980). Patients and healers in the context of culture: an exploration of the borderland between anthropology, medicine, and psychiatry. Berkeley, CA: University of California Press.
- Kleinman, Arthur (1986). Social origins of distress and disease: depression, neurasthenia, and pain in modern China. New Haven, CT: Yale University Press.
- Kleinman, Arthur, & Good, Byron, eds. (1985). Culture and Depression: studies in the anthropology and cross-cultural psychology of affect and disorder. Berkeley / Los Angeles: University of California Press.
- Luhrmann, Tanya M. (2000). Of two minds: The growing disorder in American psychiatry. New York, NY, US: Alfred A. Knopf, Inc.
- O'Nell, Theresa D. (1996). Disciplined Hearts: History, identity, and depression in an American Indian community. Berkeley, CA: University of California Press.
- Rahimi, Sadeq (2015). Meaning, Madness and Political Subjectivity. doi:10.4324/9781315732619. ISBN 9781315732619.
