= Roy D'Andrade =

American anthropologist (1931–2016)

- Born: Roy Goodwin D'Andrade; November 6, 1931; New Jersey, US
- Died: October 20, 2016 (aged 84); El Cerrito, California, US
- Awards: Doctor of Humane Letters from the University of Chicago (2001); NAS Award for Scientific Reviewing from the National Academy of Sciences (2002); Lifetime Achievement Award from the Society for Psychological Anthropology (2005)

Academic background
- Education: Rutgers University; University of Connecticut; Harvard University
- Thesis: "Father-absence and cross-sex identification." (1962)
- Doctoral advisor: John Whiting (anthropologist)

Academic work
- Discipline: Anthropology
- Sub-discipline: Psychological anthropology
- Institutions: Rutgers University; Stanford University; University of California, San Diego; University of Connecticut

Roy Goodwin D'Andrade (November 6, 1931 – October 20, 2016) was an American anthropologist. He was one of the founders of cognitive anthropology.

== Biography ==
Born on November 6, 1921, D'Andrade grew up in Metuchen, New Jersey. He matriculated at Rutgers University but left to fulfill his military service. He completed his undergraduate studies at the University of Connecticut. He then studied in the Department of Social Relations at Harvard, from which he received his PhD in Social Anthropology. He taught at Stanford University from 1962-1969. He then moved to the University of California, San Diego, where he was professor of Anthropology until 2003 and served as department chair for three separate terms. He also taught in the Anthropology department at the University of Connecticut. He died of complications of cancer on October 20, 2016.

D'Andrade's research interests ranged widely, including African-American family structure, personality, color vision, and mathematical models for reconstructing mitochondrial lineages. A unifying theme in much of his work, however, is the problem of identifying and describing cultural models (also known as folk models, or the often implicit, culturally shared ways that people assume the world works); in recent years he was particularly concerned with conceptualizing cultural through schema theory.

One problem that D'Andrade addressed was the challenge of conceptualizing how people reason in their culturally situated worlds. In one set of studies, individuals may do very poorly on abstract tests of formal logic or mathematics, but are quite capable of reasoning accurately and quickly about real-world situations with which they are familiar, and which under formal logic are ostensibly the same task. As Gardner summarizes the work of D'Andrade and his colleagues: "we can better understand the logical reasoning of humans not by imputing to them any formal logical calculus but by attending to two factors. The first has to do with content: the greater the familiarity and the richer the relevant schemata which are available, the more readily can one solve a problem. The second attribute has to do with form: one succeeds on problems to the extent that one can construct mental models that represent the relevant information in an appropriate fashion and these those mental models flexibly."

Within American anthropology in the 1990s, D'Andrade was known for expressing reservations about mixing moral and scientific aims: "our moral models about the anthropologist's responsibilities should be kept separate from our models about the world...Otherwise the result will be very bad science and very confused morality."

D'Andrade was recognized in many ways for his contributions to anthropology and to cognitive science. He was named to the U.S. National Academy of Sciences in 1998. In 2002, he was awarded the NAS Award for Scientific Reviewing from the National Academy of Sciences, and in 2005 he received the Lifetime Achievement Award from the Society for Psychological Anthropology.

== Interlocutors ==
- Naomi Quinn
- A. Kimball Romney
- Melford E. Spiro
- Claudia Strauss

== Select publications ==
- D'Andrade, Roy G. (1984). "Cultural meaning systems." In R. A. Shweder & R. LeVine (Eds.), Culture Theory: Essays on mind, self, and emotion (pp. 88–119). Cambridge, UK: Cambridge University Press.
- D'Andrade, Roy G. (1986). "Three scientific world views and the covering law model." In D. W. Fiske & R. A. Shweder (Eds.), Metatheory in Social Science: Pluralisms and subjectivities (pp. 19 – 39). Chicago: University of Chicago Press.
- D'Andrade, Roy G. (1987). "Modal responses and cultural expertise." American Behavioral Scientist, 31(2), 194 - 202.
- D'Andrade, Roy G. (1989). "Culturally based reasoning." In A. R. H. Gellatly, D. Rogers & J. A. Sloboda (Eds.), Cognition and Social Worlds (pp. 132–143). Oxford, UK: Oxford University Press.
- D'Andrade, Roy G. (1992). "Schemas and motivation." In R. G. D'Andrade & C. Strauss (eds.), Human Motives and Cultural Models (pp: 23–44). Cambridge, UK: Cambridge University Press.
- D'Andrade, Roy G. (1995). "Moral models in anthropology." Current Anthropology, 36(3).
- D'Andrade, Roy G. (1995) The Development of Cognitive Anthropology. Cambridge, UK: Cambridge University Press. ISBN 0-521-45976-1
- D'Andrade, Roy G. (2001). "A cognitivist's view of the units debate in cultural anthropology." Cross-Cultural Research, 35(2), 242 - 257.
