= Naomi Quinn =

American anthropologist (1939–2019)

Naomi Robin Quinn
- Born: July 22, 1939; Massachusetts
- Died: June 23, 2019 (aged 79); Durham, North Carolina, United States
- Children: Rachel Afi Quinn, Esther Quinn-Cuffie
- Awards: Gender Equity Award, formerly known as the CoGE "Squeaky Wheel Award"of the [American Anthropological Association] (2001); Lifetime Achievement Award from the Society of Psychological Anthropology (2009)

Academic background
- Education: Radcliffe College; Stanford University
- Thesis: "Mfantse fishing crew composition: a decision-making analysis" (1971)
- Doctoral advisor: Roy D'Andrade

Academic work
- Discipline: Anthropology
- Sub-discipline: Psychological anthropology
- Institutions: Duke University

Naomi Robin Quinn (July 22, 1939 – June 23, 2019) was a major figure in cognitive anthropology, with contributions to research methods and cultural models, particularly applied to topics such as American models of marriage and relationships and to child-rearing cross-culturally.

== Career ==
Quinn grew up in Massachusetts with parents James and Lillian Quinn and older brother Ronald, living at different times in Brighton and Newton. Her family was of Russian and Lithuanian Jewish background, and the original surname had been a form of "Cohen." Naomi later credited her brother for first mentioning the subject of anthropology to her on a visit home from Harvard, where he was studying.

Naomi earned her AB in anthropology from Radcliffe College in 1961, with Bea Whiting as her mentor. Quinn worked as a research assistant coding the aggression data from the Six Cultures project. She also participated in a summer fieldwork project in Ecuador with Marvin Harris.

Quinn entered graduate school in anthropology at Stanford in 1963, where she studied under advisor Roy D’Andrade. She earned her PhD in 1971, based on fieldwork among the Fante people in Ghana. Quinn’s focus during her dissertation research in Ghana shifted away from studying folk taxonomies toward an interest in how people acquired and processed information in natural contexts. In a series of important papers, she critiqued both microeconomic and descriptive decision models that assumed people made choices by calculating relative probabilities. Instead, her observational and in-depth interview data with Fante fish sellers, boat crew members, and elders who judged local disputes showed that they relied instead on simplifying heuristics and cultural precedents to determine outcomes. These studies also led Quinn to the insight that would shape the rest of her career: knowledge for carrying out cultural tasks is not readily verbalized; therefore, the researcher must develop an eclectic body of methods to reveal underlying assumptions and reasoning processes, something she referred to initially as the “hook or crook” technique (1976:346). In 2005, she would edit an important collection of essays, Finding Culture in Talk, which highlighted these distinctive approaches to data collection and analysis.

In 1972, Quinn joined the Department of Anthropology at Duke University, where she would remain for the rest of her career. She was promoted to associate professor in 1978 and full professor in 1999, serving as chair of Duke's Anthropology Department from 1989 to 1996. Duke recognized her excellence in teaching with its Richard K. Lublin award in 2003.

In 1976 she began a study of American marriage, and influenced by schema theory in the cognitive sciences, pioneered cultural models theory in the influential volume, Cultural Models in Language and Thought, co-edited with Dorothy Holland (1987). Later she and Claudia Strauss collaborated on A Cognitive Theory of Cultural Meaning (1997), where they articulated a view of cultural schemas as motivating and potentially enduring but also flexible and adaptive.

Quinn was a major figure of feminist scholarship as well as pathbreaking achievements within psychological anthropology and in cultural anthropology more broadly, publishing numerous important studies relevant to childhood socialization and "the gendered character of cognition", as well as studies and statements critical of anthropological institutions' treatment of women anthropologists. Quinn served on a National Academy of Sciences Committee on the Employment of Women and Related Social Issues (1981–87), and she participated in the AAA Committee to Study the Academic Employment of Women in Anthropology (1982-1993), which resulted in the publication of two major examinations of gender relations in anthropology: "A New Resolution on Fair Employment Practices for Women Anthropologists" and "Academic Employment of Women in Anthropology". In 1988, she, along with colleagues Carole Hill and Sylvia Foreman, came up with the idea to organize a Society for Feminist Anthropology; they wrote a charter and by-laws and established an organizing committee, with the new organization becoming an official part of the American Anthropological Association in 1989.

In 2001, the American Anthropological Association recognized her with its Committee on the Status of Women's "Squeaky Wheel Award", later renamed the Gender Equity Award. In 2009, Quinn was honored with the Lifetime Achievement Award from the Society for Psychological Anthropology, of which she served as President-Elect and President from 1991-1995.

== Interlocutors ==
- Roy D'Andrade
- Claudia Strauss
- Holly Matthews (anthropologist)

== Select publications ==
- Quinn, Naomi. (1977) "Anthropological Studies on Women’s Status." Annual Review of Anthropology 6:181–225.
- Quinn, Naomi. (1985). “'Commitment' in American marriage: a cultural analysis." In J. W. D. Dougherty (Ed.), Directions in cognitive anthropology (pp. 291–320). Urbana, IL: University of Illinois Press.
- Quinn, Naomi. (1996). "Culture and contradiction: the case of Americans reasoning about marriage." Ethos, 24(3), 391-425.
- Quinn, Naomi. (2005). Finding culture in talk: a collection of methods. New York: Palgrave Macmillan.
- Quinn, Naomi. (2005). "Universals of child rearing." Anthropological Theory, 5(4), 475-514.
- Strauss, Claudia, & Quinn, Naomi. (1997). A Cognitive Theory of Cultural Meaning. Cambridge, UK: Cambridge University Press.
