= Prognosis of schizophrenia =

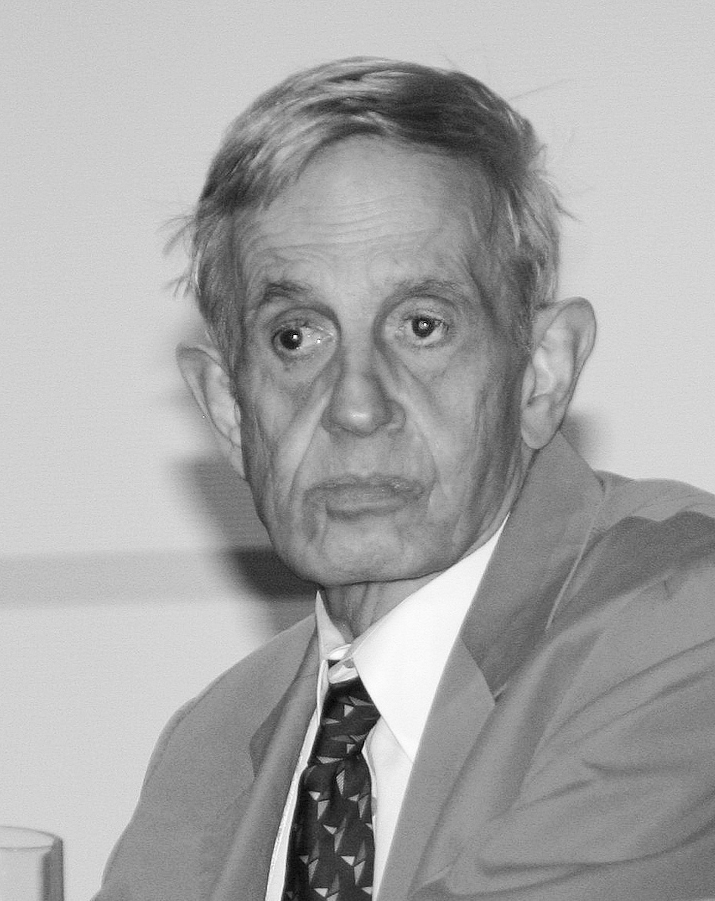
John Nash, a US mathematician, began showing signs of paranoid schizophrenia during his college years. Despite having stopped taking his prescribed medication, Nash continued his studies and was awarded the Nobel Prize in 1994. His life was depicted in the 2001 film A Beautiful Mind.

The prognosis of schizophrenia is varied at the individual level. In general it has great human and economics costs. It results in a decreased life expectancy of 12–15 years primarily due to its association with obesity, little exercise, and smoking, while an increased rate of suicide plays a lesser role. These differences in life expectancy increased between the 1970s and 1990s, and between the 1990s and 2000s. This difference has not substantially changed in Finland for example – where there is a health system with open access to care.

Schizophrenia is a major cause of disability. Approximately three quarters of people with schizophrenia have ongoing disability with relapses. Still some people do recover completely and additional numbers function well in society.

Most people with schizophrenia live independently with community support. In people with a first episode of psychosis a good long-term outcome occurs in 42% of cases, an intermediate outcome in 35% of cases, and a poor outcome in 27% of cases. Outcome for schizophrenia appear better in the developing than the developed world. These conclusions however have been questioned.

There is a higher than average suicide rate associated with schizophrenia. This has been cited at 10%, but a more recent analysis of studies and statistics places the estimate at 4.9%, most often occurring in the period following onset or first hospital admission. Several times more attempt suicide. There are a variety of reasons and risk factors.

== Course ==
After long-term follow-up half of people with schizophrenia have a favourable outcome while 16% have a delayed recovery after an early unremitting course. More usually, the course in the first two years predicted the long-term course. Early social intervention was also related to a better outcome. The findings were held as important in moving patients, careers and clinicians away from the prevalent belief of the chronic nature of the condition.

This outcome on average however is worse than for other psychotic and otherwise psychiatric disorders though a moderate number of people with schizophrenia were seen to remit and remain well, some of these without need for maintenance medication.

A clinical study using strict recovery criteria (concurrent remission of positive and negative symptoms and adequate social and vocational functioning continuously for two years) found a recovery rate of 14% within the first five years. A 5-year community study found that 62% showed overall improvement on a composite measure of clinical and functional outcomes.

=== Comorbidity ===
Those affected by schizophrenia are also more inclined to develop numerous physiological and psychological conditions. Most notably, they experience higher rates of substance abuse and suicidality; where more than half of people with schizophrenia have reported suicide ideation or attempts, and nearly half experience substance abuse or dependence. Because smoking is the most prevalent form of substance abuse among people with schizophrenia, they are also predisposed to a number of physical conditions associated with a high smoking frequency. The rates of smoking for people with schizophrenia is as high as four times that of the general population, contributing to people with schizophrenia increased risk of excess mortality, heart and lung diseases, and even diabetes.

=== Aging ===
The prevalence of schizophrenia in adults age 65 and older ranges from 0.1 to 0.5%. Aging is associated with exacerbation of schizophrenia symptoms. Positive symptoms tend to lessen with age, but negative symptoms and cognitive impairments continue to worsen.

Older adults with schizophrenia are prone to extrapyramidal side effects, anticholinergic toxicity, and sedation due to increased body fat, decreased total body water, and decreased muscle mass. Older adults with late-onset schizophrenia usually take half of the typical dose for older adults with early-onset schizophrenia. Continual drug treatment is common for older adults with schizophrenia and the dose may increase with age.

There seem to be gender differences regarding the impact of aging on schizophrenia. Men with schizophrenia tend to have more severe symptoms in the initial stage of the disorder, but gradually improve as they age. However, women with schizophrenia tend to have milder symptoms initially, and progress to more severe symptoms as they age.

The low likelihood of being married and high possibility of outliving their parents and/or siblings may lead to social isolation as one ages.

== International ==
Numerous international studies have demonstrated favorable long-term outcomes for around half of those diagnosed with schizophrenia, with substantial variation between individuals and regions. One US study found that about a third of people made a full recovery, about a third showed improvement, and a third were unchanged.

A clinical study that took into account concurrent remission of positive and negative symptoms, and adequate social and vocational functioning continuously for two years, found a recovery rate of 14% within the first five years. A five-year community study found that 62% showed overall improvement on a composite measure of symptomatic, clinical and functional outcomes. Rates are not always comparable across studies because an exact definition of what constitutes recovery has not been widely accepted, although standardized criteria have been suggested.

The World Health Organization conducted two long-term follow-up studies involving more than 2,000 people with schizophrenia in different countries. These studies found patients have much better long-term outcomes in developing countries (India, Colombia and Nigeria) than in developed countries (USA, UK, Ireland, Denmark, Czech Republic, Slovakia, Japan, and Russia), despite the fact that antipsychotic drugs are typically not widely available in poorer countries, raising questions about the effectiveness of such drug-based treatments. On its face, psychiatric medication itself may be causing the worse Western-society outcomes. Large-scale, randomized, blinded studies of alternatives are warranted.

In many non-Western societies, schizophrenia may only be treated with more informal, community-led methods. Multiple international surveys by the World Health Organization over several decades have indicated that the outcome for people diagnosed with schizophrenia in non-Western countries is on average better there than for people in the West. Many clinicians and researchers hypothesize that this difference is due to relative levels of social connectedness and acceptance, although further cross-cultural studies are seeking to clarify the findings.

Several factors are associated with a better prognosis: female gender, acute (vs. insidious) onset of symptoms, older age of first episode, predominantly positive (rather than negative) symptoms, presence of mood symptoms and good premorbid functioning. Most studies done on this subject, however, are correlational in nature, and a clear cause-and-effect relationship is difficult to establish. Evidence is also consistent that negative attitudes towards individuals with schizophrenia can have a significant adverse impact, especially within the individual's family. Family members' critical comments, hostility, authoritarian and intrusive or controlling attitudes (termed high 'expressed emotion' or 'EE' by researchers) have been found to correlate with a higher risk of relapse in schizophrenia across cultures.

== Defining recovery ==
Rates are not always comparable across studies because exact definitions of remission and recovery have not been widely established. A "Remission in Schizophrenia Working Group" has proposed standardized remission criteria involving "improvements in core signs and symptoms to the extent that any remaining symptoms are of such low intensity that they no longer interfere significantly with behavior and are below the threshold typically utilized in justifying an initial diagnosis of schizophrenia".

Standardized recovery criteria have also been proposed by a number of different researchers, with the stated DSM definitions of a "complete return to premorbid levels of functioning" or "complete return to full functioning" seen as inadequate, impossible to measure, incompatible with the variability in how society defines normal psychosocial functioning, and contributing to self-fulfilling pessimism and stigma. Some mental health professionals may have quite different basic perceptions and concepts of recovery than individuals with the diagnosis, including those in the Psychiatric survivors movement.

One notable limitation of nearly all the research criteria is failure to address the person's own evaluations and feelings about their life. Schizophrenia and recovery often involve a continuing loss of self-esteem, alienation from friends and family, interruption of school and career, and social stigma, "experiences that cannot just be reversed or forgotten". An increasingly influential model defines recovery as a process, similar to being "in recovery" from drug and alcohol problems, and emphasizes a personal journey involving factors such as hope, choice, empowerment, social inclusion and achievement.

== Treatment ==
While there is no cure for schizophrenia, there are treatment options that aim to reduce symptoms and teach those affected how to manage their day-to-day lives. In 1952, Chlorpromazine became the first typical antipsychotic medication that would effectively reduce hallucinations and delusions by blocking dopamine receptors. Continuous drug discovery has allowed for atypical antipsychotics. Rather than being limited to only blocking dopamine receptors, atypical antipsychotics also block serotonin receptors, which allows for the elevated levels of serotonin in people with schizophrenia to become balanced. With atypical antipsychotics, tremors are often reported as a common side effect because dopamine is involved in processing movement related neurons. In addition to the antipsychotics, people with schizophrenia are also typically prescribed anti-tremor medications. Aside from pharmacological treatment, cognitive behavior therapy is recommended to restructure undesirable thoughts and behaviors. Shown to be the most effective treatment, cognitive behavior therapy is intended to be supplemental to antipsychotic medication. Utilizing cognitive behavior therapy, patients with schizophrenia may learn to replace negative thoughts and behaviors constructively, distinguish reality from hallucinations or delusions, and develop coping skills; while antipsychotics treat symptoms of psychosis. Additionally, the use of atypical antipsychotics is associated with a longer life in comparison to the absence of antipsychotics.

== Predictors ==
Several factors have been associated with a better overall prognosis: Being female, rapid (vs. insidious) onset of symptoms, older age of first episode, predominantly positive (rather than negative) symptoms, presence of mood symptoms, and good pre-illness functioning. The strengths and internal resources of the individual concerned, such as determination or psychological resilience, have also been associated with better prognosis.

The attitude and level of support from people in the individual's life can have a significant impact; research framed in terms of the negative aspects of this—the level of critical comments, hostility, and intrusive or controlling attitudes, termed high 'expressed emotion'—has consistently indicated links to relapse. Most research on predictive factors is correlational in nature, however, and a clear cause-and-effect relationship is often difficult to establish.

== Violence ==
Most people with schizophrenia are not aggressive, and are more likely to be victims of violence rather than perpetrators. However, though the risk of violence in schizophrenia is small the association is consistent, and there are minor subgroups where the risk is high. This risk is usually associated with a comorbid disorder such as a substance use disorder - in particular alcohol, or with antisocial personality disorder. Substance abuse is strongly linked, and other risk factors are linked to deficits in cognition and social cognition including facial perception and insight that are in part included in theory of mind impairments. Poor cognitive functioning, decision-making, and facial perception may contribute to making a wrong judgement of a situation that could result in an inappropriate response such as violence. These associated risk factors are also present in antisocial personality disorder which when present as a comorbid disorder greatly increases the risk of violence.

A review in 2012 showed that schizophrenia was responsible for 6 per cent of homicides in Western countries. Another wider review put the homicide figure at between 5 and 20 per cent. There was found to be a greater risk of homicide during first episode psychosis that accounted for 38.5 per cent of homicides. The association between schizophrenia and violence is complex. Homicide is linked with young age, male sex, a history of violence, and a stressful event in the preceding year. Clinical risk factors are severe untreated psychotic symptoms – untreated due to either not taking medication or to the condition being treatment resistant. A comorbid substance use disorder or an antisocial personality disorder increases the risk for homicidal behaviour by 8-fold, in contrast to the 2-fold risk in those without the comorbid disorders. Rates of homicide linked to psychosis are similar to those linked to substance misuse, and parallel the overall rate in a region. What role schizophrenia has on violence independent of substance misuse is controversial, but certain aspects of individual histories or mental states may be factors.

Hostility is anger felt and directed at a person or group and has related dimensions of impulsiveness and aggression. When this impulsive-aggression is evident in schizophrenia neuroimaging has suggested the malfunctioning of a neural circuit that modulates hostile thoughts and behaviours that are linked with negative emotions in social interactions. This circuit includes the amygdala, striatum, prefrontal cortex, anterior cingulate cortex, insula, and hippocampus. Hostility has been reported during acute psychosis, and following hospital discharge. There is a known association between low cholesterol levels, and impulsivity, and violence. A review finds that people with schizophrenia, and lower cholesterol levels are four times more likely to instigate violent acts. This association is also linked to the increased number of suicides in schizophrenia. It is suggested that cholesterol levels could serve as a biomarker for violent and suicidal tendencies.

A review found that just under 10 percent of those with schizophrenia showed violent behavior compared to 1.6 percent of the general population. An excessive risk of violence is associated with drugs or alcohol and increases the risk by as much as 4-fold. Violence often leads to imprisonment. Clozapine is an effective medication that can be used in penal settings such as prisons. Cognitive deficits are recognised as playing an important part in the origin and maintenance of aggression, and cognitive remediation therapy may therefore help to prevent the risk of violence in schizophrenia.
