= Bradd Shore =

American cultural anthropologist

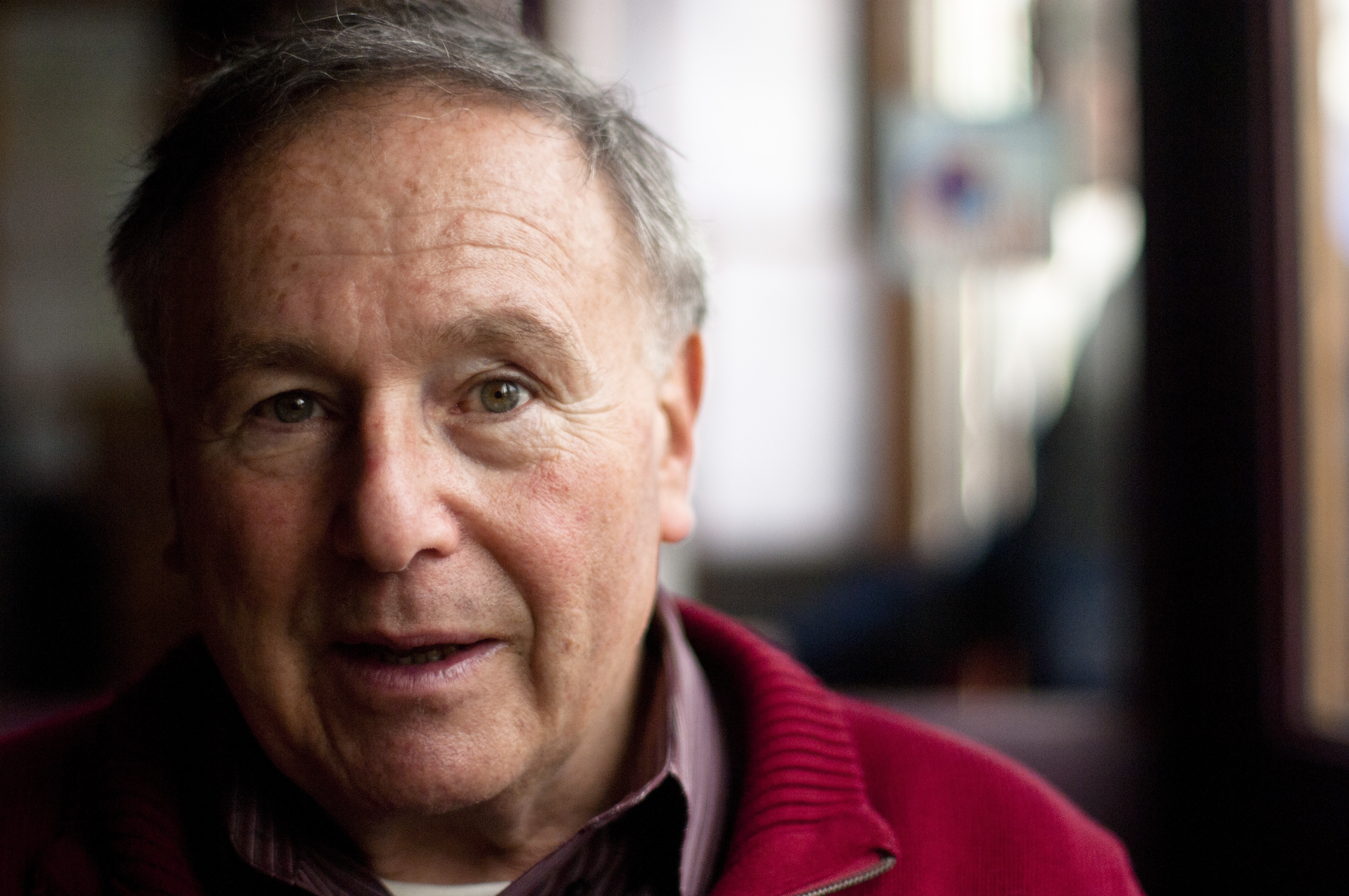
- Born: June 14, 1945 (age 81)
- Education: University of Chicago; University of California at Berkeley
- Scientific career
- Fields: Anthropology
- Workplaces: Emory University; Sarah Lawrence College
- Doctoral advisor: David M. Schneider

Bradd Shore (born June 14, 1945) is an American cultural anthropologist who is best known as a leading authority on Samoan culture and a foundational theorist of the cultural models school of cognitive and psychological anthropology. He is the Goodrich C. White Professor Emeritus of Anthropology at Emory University and is a former department chair. He is the former Director of the Emory Center for Myth and Ritual in American Life and is a past President of the Society for Psychological Anthropology, who awarded him its Lifetime Achievement Award in 2019.

His 1996 monograph Culture in Mind: Cognition, Culture and the Problem of Meaning was among the first studies to link multiculturalism to cognitive psychology, and was an effort to reformulate a conception of culture that could bridge the fields of anthropology and the cognitive sciences. It has become a keystone text in the field of cognitive anthropology. Shore's graduate research was done in Western Samoa and was focused on the local modeling of personhood and selfhood – with an emphasis on ethics, conflict and social control. It resulted in his first book, Sala’ilua: A Samoan Mystery (1982), considered one of the earliest studies of ethnopsychology. He has authored dozens of scholarly articles and chapters published in numerous Journals and edited books. Among his recent books is Shakespeare and Social Theory: The Play of Great Ideas (2021), which seeks to use an anthropological lens to build a bridge between Shakespeare studies and classical social theory. He has also produced and directed a documentary film Family Revival: Salem Camp Meeting.

Shore is the winner of the Emory Williams Teaching Award, Emory's highest award for teaching. He was the first holder of the Emory College Distinguished Teaching Professorship in the Sciences and Social Sciences.

He is a former Fellow (1988–89) at the Center for Advanced Study in the Behavioral Sciences in Palo Alto, California.

Shore received his B.A. from the University of California at Berkeley, and his Ph.D. in anthropology from the University of Chicago, where he studied with Marshall Sahlins and David M. Schneider.

== Books ==
· At the Crossroads of Psychology and Anthropology: In Conversation with Jerome Bruner (2025).
· The Hidden Powers of Ritual (2023).
· Shakespeare and Social Theory: The Play of Great Ideas (2021).
· What Culture Means, How Culture Means (The Heinz Werner Lectures) (1998).
· Culture in Mind: Cognition, Culture and the Problem of Meaning (1996).
· Sala’ilua: A Samoan Mystery (1982).
· New Neighbors: Pacific Islander Migration in Adaptation (1978) (Edited, with C. MacPherson and R. Franco).
