= Cognitive Anthropology of Symbolic Systems =

Interdisciplinary academic field

Cognitive anthropology of symbolic systems is an interdisciplinary field that examines how human beings create, transmit, and interpret symbolic structures in relation to universal cognitive mechanisms and recurrent patterns found in nature. It lies at the intersection of cognitive anthropology, cognitive science, complex systems theory, semiotics, and the history of ideas.

The field investigates why certain symbolic motifs—such as dualities, fractals, cycles, and hierarchical structures—appear across cultures and how these motifs may reflect perceptual and cognitive invariants as well as structural regularities observed in natural systems.

== Theoretical foundations ==
=== Cognitive anthropology ===
Cognitive anthropology studies the mental processes underlying cultural representations. Foundational works by Dan Sperber, Pascal Boyer, Scott Atran, and Maurice Bloch collectively argue that cultural forms are shaped by universal cognitive dispositions.

=== Genetic epistemology ===
Jean Piaget's genetic epistemology explores how cognitive structures develop in children and evolve historically in scientific thought. These developmental patterns help explain the recurrence of symbolic schemas across cultures.

=== Cognitive science ===
Research in cognitive science, including work by Francisco Varela, Antonio Damasio and Gerald Edelman, emphasizes the embodied, dynamic and emergent nature of cognition. These processes contribute to the formation of symbolic structures.

=== Complex systems theory ===
Complex systems theory, developed by Edgar Morin, Stuart Kauffman and Geoffrey West, provides a framework for understanding why certain forms—fractals, networks, cycles, dualities, etc.—emerge repeatedly in natural and cultural systems.

== Symbolic systems in human cultures ==
=== Dualities ===
Symbolic dualities such as Yin and yang, light/darkness, or order/chaos appear in many cultural traditions. They are interpreted as fundamental cognitive schemas for organizing experience.

=== Geometric motifs ===
Geometric patterns such as the Flower of Life, mandalas, Celtic knots, and Islamic geometric art exhibit symmetry, repetition, and self-similarity. These motifs are studied in anthropology of art and semiotics.

=== Cycles and cosmogonic narratives ===
Symbols such as the Ouroboros, seasonal cycles, and myths of death and rebirth reflect cyclical conceptions of time and transformation.

=== Microcosm and macrocosm ===
Many traditions draw parallels between the human being (microcosm) and the universe (macrocosm), a recurring symbolic structure in comparative mythology and the history of ideas.

== Cognition and the perception of patterns ==
=== Neuroscience of form perception ===
Neuroscientific research shows that the human brain is highly sensitive to symmetry, contrast, and repetitive patterns.

=== Fractals and perceptual invariants ===
Humans spontaneously recognize and aesthetically prefer fractal patterns found in nature. This may explain the presence of fractal motifs in symbolic systems.

=== Categorization and conceptual schemas ===
Human cognition relies on universal conceptual schemas (cause/effect, center/periphery, cycle, hierarchy), which shape symbolic production across cultures.

== Complex systems in nature ==
=== Neural networks ===
The human brain is a complex network characterized by small-world properties, modular hierarchy, and fractal organization.

=== Large-scale structure of the universe ===
The distribution of galaxies forms a filamentary network known as the cosmic web. A quantitative comparison by Franco Vazza and Alberto Feletti found statistical similarities between the cosmic web and neural networks.

=== Ecosystems and biological systems ===
Ecosystems, trophic networks, and physiological systems exhibit emergent properties comparable to those found in symbolic and cognitive systems.

== Parallels between ancient intuitions and modern science ==
Several scholars have noted structural parallels between ancient symbolic systems and contemporary scientific models:

- symbolic dualities and fundamental symmetries in physics
- fractal motifs and self-similar natural structures
- cyclical myths and systemic feedback loops
- microcosm/macrocosm analogies and structural similarities between brain and universe

These parallels are studied within academic frameworks without implying direct causal connections.

== Contemporary applications ==
The cognitive anthropology of symbolic systems is used in:

- anthropology of religion
- anthropology of art
- cognitive science of culture
- philosophy of mind
- interdisciplinary studies of complex systems

== Criticism and limitations ==
Scholars emphasize the need to distinguish:

- structural analogies
- symbolic interpretations
- scientifically unsupported comparisons

Care must be taken to avoid overextending analogies between symbolic systems and scientific models.

== See also ==
- Cognitive anthropology
- Cognitive science
- Complex systems
- Symbolic anthropology
- Semiotics
- Philosophy of mind
- History of ideas
- Cosmic web
- Fractal
- Embodied cognition
