= Jeannette Mageo =

American psychological anthropologist

Jeannette Marie Mageo (1947 – February 12, 2023) was an American psychological anthropologist at Washington State University. She was known for her anthropological work that focused on dreams and the self, attachment and childhood, gender and sexuality.

Mageo died on February 12, 2023.

== Education and career ==
Mageo was born in 1947. She received her B.A. at the State University of New York, Stony Brook, in 1970 and her doctoral degree, in psychological anthropology, at the University of California, Santa Cruz, in 1979. Her dissertation was titled "The image and the soul. An Anthropological Critique of Jung’s Psychology." She subsequently worked at multiple institutions including American Samoa Community College, the University of California at Los Angeles, University College London, and the University of Hawaiʻi. In 1993, she joined Washington State University as an assistant professor and was then promoted by professor in 2003. Mageo began serving as chair of the Faculty Senate in 2018.

== Selected publications ==
- 1996 Spirits in Culture, History, and Mind. Co-edited with Alan Howard (University of Hawai'i). Routledge.
- 1998 Theorizing Self in Samoa: Emotions, Genders and Sexualities. University of Michigan Press.
- 2001 Cultural Memory: Reconfiguring History and Identity in the Pacific. Edited volume. University of Hawai’i Press.
- 2002 Power and the Self. Edited volume. Cambridge University Press.
- 2003 Dreaming and the Self: New Perspectives on Subjectivity, Identity, and Emotion. Edited volume. State University of New York Press.
- Mageo, Jeannette Marie (2022). The Mimetic Nature of Dream Mentation: American Selves in Re-formation. Culture, Mind, and Society. doi:10.1007/978-3-030-90231-5. ISBN 978-3-030-90230-8. ISSN 2637-6806.

== Honors and awards ==
Her 2022 book, The Mimetic Nature of Dream Mentation, was awarded the Boyer Prize by the Society for Psychological Anthropology.
