= Expressed emotion =

In psychology, measurement attitudes towards someone

Expressed emotion (EE) is a measure of the family environment that is based on how the relatives of a psychiatric patient spontaneously talk about the patient. It specifically measures three to five aspects of the family environment: the most important are critical comments, hostility, emotional over-involvement, with positivity and warmth sometimes also included as indications of a low-EE environment. The psychiatric measure of expressed emotion is distinct from the general notion of communicating emotion in interpersonal relationships, and from another psychological metric known as family emotional expressiveness.

A high level of EE in the home can worsen the prognosis in patients with mental illness, such as schizophrenia and social anxiety disorder, or act as a potential risk factor for the development of psychiatric disease. Higher degrees of expressed emotion in the environment of a patient have been empirically found to be robust predictors of relapse of schizophrenia, eating disorder, and mood disorders. It has also been investigated as a contributor to the progress of unipolar depression, bipolar disorder, dementia, and diabetes. Interventions to improve outcomes include reducing contact with high-EE caregivers, and educating and supporting families so they can reduce high-EE behavior.

Various mechanisms have been proposed to explain why high EE family environments produce worse outcomes, including that:

- Critical comments often misidentify certain behaviors as laziness or selfishness rather than symptoms of a mental illness.
- Over-protectiveness can undermine the patient's self-reliance and ability to use their own skills to solve mental health problems.
- High-EE behaviors can be a source of psychological stress, which exacerbates mental illness (the diathesis–stress model).

Typically it is determined whether a person or family has high EE or low EE through a taped interview known as the Camberwell Family Interview (CFI). Answers to questions and non-verbal cues are used to determine if someone has high expressed emotion. There is another measurement that is taken from the view of the patient, which rates the patient's perception of how their family feels about them and the disorder. An alternative measure of expressed emotion is the Five Minutes Speech Sample (FMSS), where the relatives are asked to talk about the patient for five uninterrupted minutes. Although this measure requires more training, it becomes a quicker form of assessment than the CFI.

== History ==
A 1956 study of readmissions of schizophrenia patients in London by George Brown found that patients discharged to live with their parents or wives were more frequently readmitted than those discharged to live with siblings or non-family in lodging houses. It also found that those that lived with their mothers were more likely to be readmitted if the mothers did not work outside the home, suggesting that the duration of exposure to certain family members was related to relapse. Brown devised the five dimensions of expressed emotion to quantify the interpersonal environmental exposures of patients.

The advantage of a low-EE environment has been cited to partly explain the success of the Belgian village of Geel, where residents have for hundreds of years welcomed unrelated people with mental illness to live with them. Janis H. Jenkins and her team conducted the first study showing that Mexican immigrants’ familial emotional responses of warmth and sympathy toward mentally ill kin in the United States contributes to a more favorable course of illness than in the case of their Euro-American counterparts.

== High expressed emotion ==
Family members with high expressed emotion are hostile, very critical and not tolerant of the patient. They feel like they are helping by having this attitude. They not only criticize behaviors relating to the disorder but also other behaviors that are unique to the personality of the patient. High expressed emotion is more likely to cause a relapse than low expressed emotion.

The three dimensions of high EE are hostility, emotional over-involvement and critical comments.

=== Hostility ===
Hostility is a negative attitude directed at the patient because the family feels that the disorder is controllable and that the patient is choosing not to get better. Problems in the family are often blamed on the patient and the patient has trouble problem solving in the family. The family believes that the cause of many of the family's problems is the patient's mental illness, whether they are or not.

=== Emotional over-involvement ===
Emotional over-involvement reflects a set of feelings and behavior of a family member towards the patient, indicating evidence of over-protectiveness or self-sacrifice, excessive use of praise or blame, preconceptions and statements of attitude. Family members who show high emotional involvement tend to be more intrusive. Therefore, families with high emotional involvement may believe that patients cannot help themselves and that their problems are due to causes external to them, and thus high involvement will lead to strategies of taking control and doing things for the patients. In addition, patients may feel very anxious and frustrated when interacting with family caregivers with high emotional involvement due to such high intrusiveness and emotional display towards them. On the whole, families with high EE appear to be poorer communicators with their ill relative as they might talk more and listen less effectively. Emotional over-involvement demonstrates a different side compared to hostile and critical attitudes but is still similar with the negative affect that causes a relapse. The relative becomes so overbearing that the patient can no longer live with this kind of stress from pity, and falls back into their illness as a way to cope.

=== Critical comments ===
Critical comments include complaints that the patient is a burden to the family, that the patient is not following instructions, or that the patient is lazy or selfish.

== Interventions ==
Low expressed emotion occurs when the family members are less critical or hostile, and not overly-involved. Low expressed emotion is associated with more positive outcomes for the patient. Psychoeducation on the course and associated effects of the illness, as well as behavioral interventions and communication training can help families move from high expressed emotion to low expressed emotion. However, it is believed that in the early stages of the illness, families should be allowed to grieve and be supported emotionally, and that behavioral interventions can actually increase relapse rates at this critical juncture.

High expressed emotion, by contrast, makes the patient feel trapped, out of control and dependent upon others. The patient may feel like an outsider because of the excessive attention received. Expressed emotion affects everyone in the home, raising the stress level for the family and often increasing anxiety and depression among family members. The behavior of everyone around the patient influences the course of the patient's illness. Academics suggest that movement from high to low expressed emotion is best facilitated by a family therapist, psychiatrist, or family worker, preferably one experienced in the treatment of families with a psychotic family member. Family therapists suggest that treatment is more successful with the attendance of as many household members as possible, in order to give a more complete picture of family patterns. However, the necessity of family therapy does not indicate that the illness is the fault of the family. Family therapy in this area has moved away from the notion that family communication patterns are responsible for psychosis, a notion popularized in the 1960s by family systems therapist Murray Bowen.

== Validity ==
Some studies show that there is no link between expressed emotion and first episode psychosis, illness severity, age of onset, and illness length.

There is also literature that links EE to the course and outcome of numerous major childhood psychiatric disorders. One study showed that one component, high parental dimensions of criticism (CRIT), can be used as an index of problematic parent–child interactions.

In social anxiety disorder, it has been found parents' high level of expressed emotion (emotional overinvolvement, criticism, hostility) is strongly associated with treatment outcome in their children.

== See also ==
- Social defeat
- Double Bind
