= J. S. Kennedy =

British entomologist

John Stodart Kennedy
- Born: 19 May 1912; Titusville, Pennsylvania, US
- Died: 4 February 1993 (aged 80); Oxford, United Kingdom
- Education: Westminster School, Imperial College London, University College London
- Awards: Fellow of the Royal Society, Linnean Medal
- Scientific career
- Fields: Entomology

John Stodart Kennedy FRS (19 May 1912 – 4 February 1993) was an American-born British entomologist.

Kennedy was born in Titusville, Pennsylvania, the only son of James John Stodart Kennedy, an Anglo-Scottish railway engineer, and his American wife, Edith Roberts Lammers. After a living in several parts of the world the family returned to the UK after World War I, where John was able to go to Westminster School and study entomology at Imperial College London, which he left in favour of University College London.

During World War II he worked on a Colonial Office organising crop dusting as part of an anti-locust campaign. After the war he worked for some twenty years in the ARC unit at Cambridge, during which time he met and married marine biologist Claudette Bloch (née Raphael), mother of Maurice Bloch, before returning in 1967 to Imperial College as Professor of Animal Behaviour.

Kennedy was elected a Fellow of the Royal Society in 1965. His nomination citation stated that he "Has studied a wide variety of problems in the physiology and behaviour of insects, particularly mosquitos, locusts and aphids. Was one of the first to use experimental methods for the study of locust behaviour in the field; his original ideas on the orientation and movements of locusts have exerted a wide influence, as have his recent analyses of migratory activity and phase change. His publications on nutrition, behaviour and virus transmission by aphids are equally important; he has gone far towards interpreting ecological behaviour in terms of physiological responses as studied in the laboratory. His work is characterised by penetrating and original thought and ingenious experiment."

Kennedy was awarded the Linnean Medal in 1984 by the Linnean Society of London. In 2009, a building erected on Imperial College's Silwood campus was named after him. His papers are in the archives of the Imperial College London, Archives and Corporate Records Unit.
