= James D. Hollan =

American cognitive scientist

Dr. James Hollan
- Education: University of Florida; Stanford University
- Known for: His research pertaining to computationally based media
- Awards: ACM SIGCHI Lifetime Research Award (2015)
- Scientific career
- Fields: Cognitive science
- Workplaces: University of California, San Diego; University of New Mexico

James D. Hollan is professor of cognitive science and adjunct professor of computer science at the University of California, San Diego. In collaboration with Professor Edwin Hutchins, he directs the Distributed Cognition and Human–Computer Interaction Laboratory at UCSD, and co-directs the Design Lab. Hollan has also spent time working at Xerox PARC and at Bellcore. He was elected to the CHI Academy in 2003 and received the ACM SIGCHI Lifetime Research Award in 2015.

His research explores the cognitive consequences of computationally based media. The goal is to understand the cognitive and computational characteristics of dynamic interactive representations as the basis for effective system design. His current work focuses on cognitive ethnography, computer-mediated communication, distributed cognition, human–computer interaction, information visualization, multiscale software, and tools for analysis of video data.

His current research is funded by the National Science Foundation (NSF), Intel, Nissan, and the University of California's Digital Media Innovation program. Recently completed research has been funded by Darpa, Intel, NSF, and Sony.

After completing a PhD in cognitive psychology at the University of Florida and a postdoctoral fellowship in artificial intelligence at Stanford University, Hollan was on the research faculty at the University of California, San Diego for a decade. Along with Edwin Hutchins and Donald Norman, he led the Intelligent Systems Group in the Institute for Cognitive Science at UCSD and the Future Technologies Group at NPRDC. Hollan left UCSD to become Director of the MCC Human Interface Laboratory and subsequently established the Computer Graphics and Interactive Media Research Group at Bellcore. In 1993, he moved to the University of New Mexico as Chair of the Computer Science Department. In 1997, Hollan returned to UCSD as Professor of Cognitive Science.
