= Camberwell Family Interview =

Camberwell Family Interview is a type of a semi-structured interview form used to analyze emotional expressions of caregivers specifically dealing with patients of adult psychiatric disorders, particularly schizophrenia as well as the patients and their families. The interview generally assesses the patient's and their relatives’ behavior in the period three months before they are hospitalized and is generally conducted within a few days after hospitalization.

== Applications ==
The CFI technique examines the relatives of patients regarding the difficulties they have faced and are facing because of the disease. It helps in determining the history of the patient about the disease, hospitalization history, and symptoms.

== Criticism ==
CFI is criticized for being impractical as an effective technique in clinical practice to measure expressed emotions (EE). This criticism is based on the fact that the technique requires highly trained professionals to interview subjects (patients and their family members) and requires approximately 3 hours per assessment including the subsequent coding of the interviews.

== See also ==
- Expressed emotion
