= Edwin Hutchins =

American cognitive scientist (born 1948)

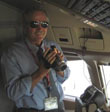

Edwin Hutchins (born 1948) is an American cognitive scientist. He is a professor and former department head of cognitive science at the University of California, San Diego. Hutchins is one of the main developers of distributed cognition.

== Education ==
Hutchins was a student of the cognitive anthropologist Roy D'Andrade.

== Career ==
Hutchins has been a strong advocate of the use of anthropological methods in cognitive science. He is considered the father of modern cognitive ethnography. His early work involved studies of logic in legal discourse among people of the Trobriand Islands, Papua New Guinea.

For a time, Hutchins worked in the Navy doing research on how crews of a ship can function as a distributed machine, offloading the cognitive burden of ship navigation onto each member of the crew. He was a recipient of the prestigious MacArthur "Genius Grant".

In 1995, Hutchins published Cognition in the Wild, a detailed study of distributed cognitive processes in a navy ship (an Iwo Jima-class amphibious assault ship); like other works related to distributed cognition, it criticizes disembodied views of cognition and proposes an alternative which looks at cognitive systems that may be composed of multiple agents and the material world.

Other areas of Hutchins' work include the study of airline cockpits, the development of cognitive ethnographic methods and tools, and human-computer interaction. He ran the Distributed Cognition and Human Computer Interaction Laboratory at UC San Diego, in collaboration with James Hollan until 2014. He is now professor emeritus in the UC San Diego Department of Cognitive Science.

== Selected bibliography ==
- Hutchins, E. (1995). Cognition in the Wild. MIT press.
