= Cultural schema theory =

Cognitive theory at the cultural level

Cultural schema theory is a cognitive theory that explains how people organize and process information about events and objects in their cultural environment. According to the theory, individuals rely on schemas, or mental frameworks, to understand and make sense of the world around them. These schemas are shaped by culture, and they help people to quickly and efficiently process information that is consistent with their cultural background. Cultural schemas can include knowledge about social roles, customs, and beliefs, as well as expectations about how people will behave in certain situations. The theory posits that cultural schemas are formed through repeated interactions and experiences within a particular cultural group, and that they guide behavior in familiar social situations. Cultural schemas are distinct from other schemas in that they are shared among members of a particular cultural group, as opposed to being unique to individuals.

== History ==
The development of the Cultural Schema theory stems from the history of the concept of a Schema as highlighted in this timeline:

Ancient Greece: The idea of schemas existing as ideal types in the mind dates back all the way back to Plato.

19th century: Immanuel Kant conceptualized the role of experiences in development of reason and developed the argument that reason is structured through forms of experience- coining the phrase "Act only according to the maxim by which you can at the same time will that it should become a universal law." This statement argues that one should act only in ways that are deemed universally moral and reasonable, both of which are dependent on an individual's experiences and development of reason and morality.

1920s: Jean Piaget's work on cognitive development in children furthered the research made toward cultural schemata theory. Piaget's theory proposed that children progress through four major stages of cognitive development: the sensorimotor stage, the preoperational stage, the concrete operational stage, and the formal operational stage. He argued that children actively construct their understanding of the world through their experiences and interactions with their environment.

1930s: Frederic Bartlett's research showed that memory is influenced by cultural and social factors. He found that people from different cultures and backgrounds often remember information differently based on their cultural norms and beliefs. Bartlett proposed that people use their schema, or mental frameworks, to organize and interpret new information based on their existing knowledge and expectations. He argued that people tend to remember information that is consistent with their schema, while distorting or forgetting information that is inconsistent with their schema.

Further research was done in the following years to develop what is now known as the Cultural Schema Theory.

== How cultural schemas develop ==
Research reveals that schemas operate at many different levels. The experiences which are unique to individuals allow them to acquire personal schemas. Societal schemas may emerge from a group's collective knowledge and are represented across the minds in a society, enabling people to think as if they are one mind. However, when one's cultural environment provides experiences to which every member of that culture is exposed, their experiences allow every member to acquire cultural schemas. Cultural schemas are conceptual structures which enable individuals to store perceptual and conceptual information about their culture and interpret experiences and expressions through cultural lenses. If people are not equipped with the appropriate cultural schema, they may not be able to make sense of culturally unfamiliar situations.

When one interacts with members of the same culture frequently, or talks about certain information with them many times, cultural schemas are created and stored in one's brain. Subsequent similar instances cause the cultural schema to become more organized, abstract, and compact. As this occurs, communication becomes much easier. It is explained that experience is the force which creates cultural schemas. As people have more experiences their developing cultural schemas become more tightly organized. The information not only becomes more complex, but more useful among members of a culture, alike or different. Beyond the cognitive activity of cultural schemas is the complex pattern which occurs in the brain.

Not all schemas are uniformly important. High-level schemas are internalized and emotionally salient; likewise, when a schema is only weakly related to a person's self it becomes emotionally empty and irrelevant.

== Types of cultural schemas for social interactions ==
Cultural schemas for social interactions are cognitive structures that contain knowledge for face-to-face interactions in one's cultural environment. There are eight primary types for generating human behavior for social interactions. These eight schemas are also referred to as Primary Social Interaction (PSI) schemas:

1. Fact-and-concept schemas: These are pieces of general information about facts.
2. Person schemas: These are knowledge about different types of people, specifically personality traits.
3. Self schemas: These contain people's knowledge of how they see themselves and knowledge of how others see them.
4. Role schemas: These are knowledge about social roles that denote expected sets of behaviors of people in particular social positions.
5. Context schemas: These contain information about the situations and appropriate settings of behavioral parameters. Information in context schemas includes predictions about appropriate actions to take in order to achieve goals in the respective context. Information also includes suggestions for reasonable problem-solving strategies.
6. Procedure schemas: These are knowledge about the appropriate sequence of events in common situations. This includes the specific steps to take and the appropriate behavioral rules for the events. The use of procedure schemas causes people to take certain actions some way.
7. Strategy schemas: These are knowledge about problem-solving strategies.
8. Emotion schemas: These contain information about affect and evaluation stored in long-term memory. This is accessed when other schemas are activated. Emotion schemas develop through social interactions throughout a person's life. Researchers believe it is an important additive because emotions play integral roles in human social interactions.

== Application to cross-cultural adaptation ==
The term cross-cultural adaptation refers to the complex process through which an individual acquires an increasing level of the communication skills of the host culture and of relational development with host nationals. Simply put, cross-cultural adaptation is the transformation of a person's own PSI schemas into those of the host culture and acquisition of new PSI schemas in the host culture s/he is residing in. A number of different people may be subject to cross-cultural adaptation, including immigrants, refugees, business people, diplomats, foreign workers, and students.

However, this entry specifically applies cultural schema theory to sojourners' cross cultural adaptation. Sojourners generally spend a few years in another culture while intending to return to their home country. Business people, diplomats, students, and foreign workers can all be classified as sojourners. In order to better explain sojourners' cross-cultural adaptation, axioms are used to express causal, correlational, or teleological relationships. Axioms also help to explain the basic assumptions of the cultural schema theory.

The 10 sojourners' axioms are as follows:

1. The more often a person repeats a schema-based behavior in his or her culture, the more likely the cultural schema will be stored in the person's memory.
2. Sojourners' failure to recognize the actions and behaviors that are relevant to meaningful interactions in the host culture are mainly due to their lack of the PSI schemas of the culture.
3. The acquisition of the PSI schemas of the host culture is a necessary condition for sojourners' cross-cultural adaptation to the culture.
4. The PSI schemas of a person's own culture are interrelated with each other, forming a network of cultural schemas to generate behaviors that are appropriate in the culture. Experience in the host culture causes a change in one's cultural schema. This causes further changes in all other cultural schemas and results in a total change in behavior.
5. The acquisition of information about interrelationships among the PSI schemas of the host culture is a necessary condition for sojourners' cross-cultural adaptation.
6. People use both schema-driven and data-driven processing to perceive new information, depending on the situation and their motivations.
7. If one has well-organized cultural schemas, schematically salient information is more likely to be processed through the schemas, whereas ambiguous information will either direct a search for the relevant data to complete the stimulus more fully, or it will be filled in with default options of the schemas.
8. Sojourners who lack the PSI schemas of the host culture are more likely to employ data-driven processing, which requires effort and attention.
9. In the host culture, sojourners encounter truly novel situations where they experience cognitive uncertainty and anxiety because of the lack of the PSI schemas in the situations.
10. In the host culture, sojourners experience the stages of self-regulation and self-direction. In the stage of self-regulation, they try to resolve ambiguities and to establish integration of information using their native-culture schemas by gradually modifying them. In the stage of self-direction, on the other hand, they actively try to reorganize their native culture schemas or to generate host culture schemas in order to adapt to the host-culture environment.

== Real-world example: a sojourner's experience ==
The term "sojourners" refers to individuals who reside in a culture that is not their own, with the intention of eventually returning home. Gillian Gibbons, a British teacher, traveled to Khartoum, Sudan in August 2007 to teach young students at Unity School. During a lesson on bears, a student brought in a teddy bear for the class to name. The majority of students voted to name the bear Muhammad, which led to Gibbons' arrest on November 25, 2007. She was charged under Article 125 of Sudanese criminal law for insulting Islam's Prophet Muhammad, a serious offense in Islam. Gibbons faced a maximum penalty of 40 lashes and 6 months in jail, but was found guilty and sentenced to 15 days in jail and deportation from Sudan after her release. She was granted a pardon by Sudanese President Omar al-Bashir following pressure from the British government, and returned to England after serving nine days in jail.

The incident involving Gibbons can be explained by the cultural schema theory, particularly with regard to her status as a sojourner in an unfamiliar culture. Axiom number three and axiom number nine of the theory apply to Gibbons' situation. As a sojourner, it is necessary to acquire the host culture's primary, secondary, and isolated (PSI) schemas in order to adapt cross-culturally. However, Gibbons lived within the walls of Unity School, which was vastly different from the rest of Sudan and did not require her to acquire the PSI schemas of the host culture. This lack of understanding of local PSI schemas likely led to her allowing the children to name the teddy bear Muhammad, which is unacceptable in Sudanese culture. This highlights the difficulties of cross-cultural adaptation for sojourners like Gibbons, who do not intend to stay and therefore may not fully adapt to the host culture.

== Contrasting theory ==
Cultural schema theory is often compared and contrasted with the cultural consensus theory. Both theories present distinct perspectives about the nature of individual and cultural knowledge. However, unlike the cultural schema theory, the cultural consensus theory helps to describe and mathematically measure the extent to which cultural beliefs are shared. The central idea is the use of the pattern of agreement or consensus among members of the same culture. Essentially, the more knowledge people have, the more consensus is observed among them.

However, the cultural consensus theory does not help others to better understand intercultural variability or how cultural knowledge is interrelated at a cognitive level. Cultural consensus theory anticipates intercultural variation but views variation as analogous to performance on a cultural test, with certain individuals functioning as better guides than others to the cultural information pool.

== Further use and development of the theory ==
Cultural schema theory refers to cultural-specific knowledge that individuals possess about the world. To advance the theory and establish its axioms, additional research and validation is needed.

The theory can be utilized in cross-cultural training to aid individuals in adapting to their host culture environments. Efforts have been made towards this goal, such as using Cultural Schema Theory to argue that cross-cultural exposure stimulates entrepreneurial intentions by developing alertness, which improves one's capacity to identify novel business opportunities.

== See also ==
- Culture shock
- Framing (social sciences)
- Intercultural communication
- Intercultural competence
