= Maurice Bloch =

British anthropologist

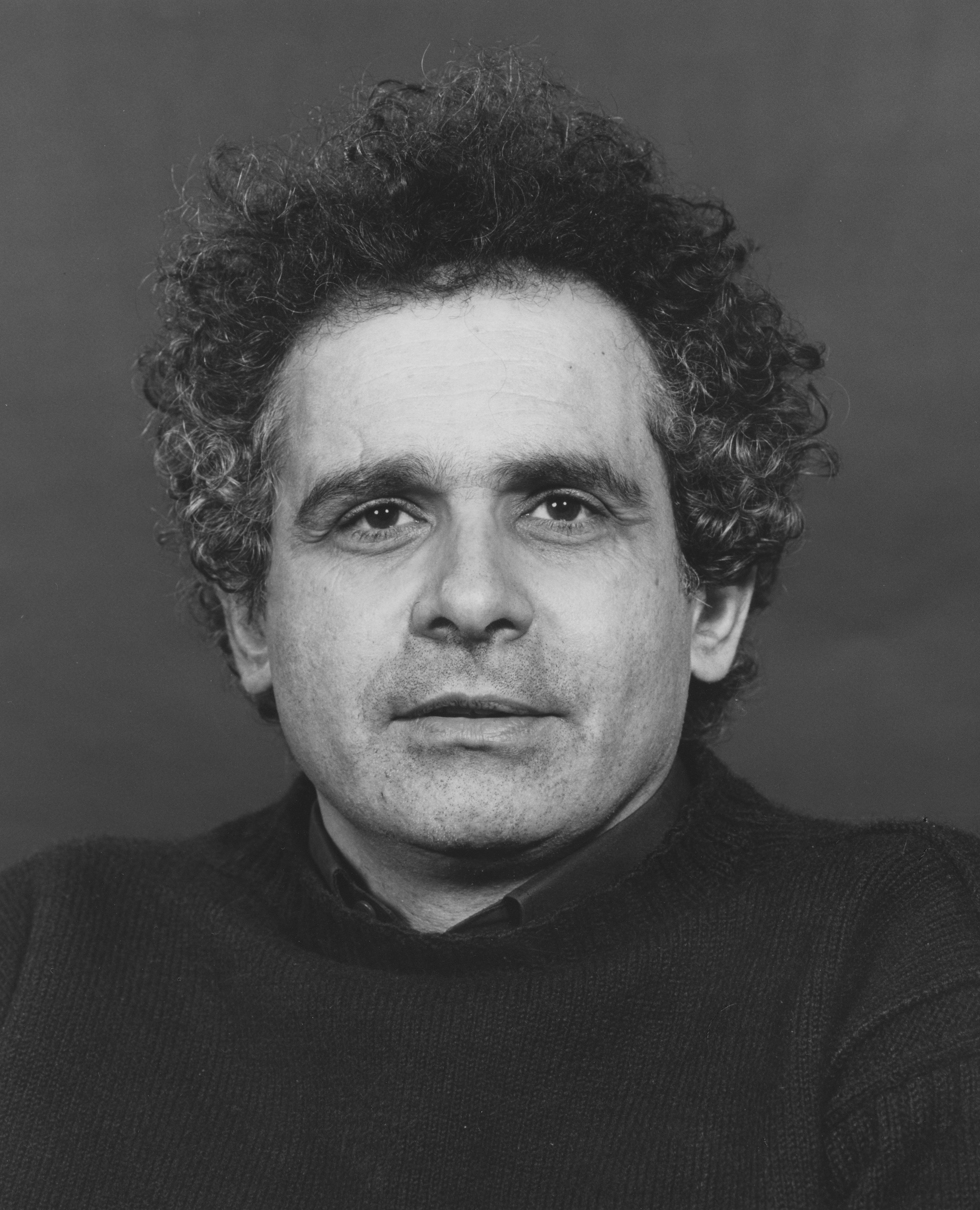
- Born: 21 October 1939 (age 86); Caen, Calvados, France
- Citizenship: British
- Education: London School of Economics; Fitzwilliam College, Cambridge (PhD)
- Scientific career
- Fields: Anthropology
- Workplaces: London School of Economics

Maurice Émile Félix Bloch (born 21 October 1939) is a British anthropologist. He is famous for his fieldwork on the shift of agriculturalists in Madagascar, Japan and other parts of the world, and has also contributed important neo-Marxian work on power, history, kinship, and ritual.

== Early life and education ==
Maurice Bloch was born in Caen, Calvados, to Jewish parents Claudette (née Raphael), a marine biologist, and Pierre Bloch, an engineer. His grandmother was a niece of sociologist Emile Durkheim and a much younger first cousin of anthropologist Marcel Mauss. Maurice attended the Lycée Carnot in Paris. His father was killed by the Nazis while in the French Army. When Maurice was eleven, his widowed mother married British biologist John S. Kennedy, whom she had met at a conference. She and her son moved to England to join Kennedy, and Bloch became a British citizen, attending The Perse School in Cambridge.

He studied as an undergraduate at the London School of Economics (LSE), attending lectures at the School of Oriental and African Studies. He continued his training in anthropology at Fitzwilliam College, Cambridge, where he obtained his doctorate in 1968.

== Career ==
His subsequent career has been almost entirely at the LSE, where he was appointed a full professor in 1983.

In 2005 Bloch was appointed European Professor at the Collège de France. He was until 2009 visiting professor at the Free University of Amsterdam. He has taught and has been an occasional visiting professor in most European countries, as well as Japan. In the US, he was a visiting professor at the University of California, Berkeley, at the Johns Hopkins University in Baltimore, and at the New School for Social Research in New York City. At present, he is emeritus professor at the LSE and an associate member of the Institut Jean Nicod of the École Normale Supérieure in Paris.

He has supervised many younger anthropologists, several of whom hold prestigious posts in the UK, US, Australia, Japan, France, Canada, the Netherlands, China, Argentina, Madagascar and Malaysia. His writings have been translated into at least twelve languages.

In 1990, Bloch was elected a Fellow of the British Academy.

== Research ==
Bloch's field research has been mainly carried out in two different areas of Madagascar. One field site has been among the peasants of central Imerina; and the other in a remote forest inhabited by a group of people called Zafimaniry. His writing deals with religion, kinship, economics, politics and language. His research has been much influenced by French Marxist ideas.

He has been an innovator in relating social anthropology to linguistics and cognitive psychology. Much of his theoretical work since the 1970s has concerned the interface between cognition and social and cultural life. What he has written on this subject faces two ways: on the one hand, he criticises anthropologists for exaggerating the particularity of specific cultures; on the other hand, he criticises cognitive scientists for underestimating it.

He has published more than a hundred articles and many books, half of which concern Madagascar in some way.

== See also ==
- Cognitive anthropology

== Publications ==
His books include:

- 1971 Placing the Dead: Tombs, Ancestral Villages, and Kinship Organization in Madagascar, London: Seminar Press (Extracts translated into Malagasy).
- 1975 Political Language, Oratory and Traditional Society, (ed.) London: Academic Press.
- 1975 Marxist Analyses and Social Anthropology (ed.), A.S.A. Studies. London: Malaby Press.
- 1982 Death and the Regeneration of Life (ed. with J. Parry), Cambridge: CUP.
- 1983 Marxism and Anthropology: The History of a Relationship, Oxford: Clarendon.
- 1986 From Blessing to Violence: History and Ideology in the Circumcision Ritual of the Merina of Madagascar, Cambridge: CUP.
- 1989 Money and the Morality of Exchange (ed. with J. Parry) Cambridge: CUP.
- 1992 Prey into Hunter: The Politics of Religious Experience, Cambridge: CUP
- 1998 How We Think They Think: Anthropological Studies in Cognition, Memory and Literacy. Boulder: Westview Press.
- 2005 Essays in the Transmission of Culture. Berg: London.
- 2012 Anthropology and the Cognitive Challenge. Cambridge: CUP.
- 2013 In and Out of Each Other's Bodies: Theories of Mind, Evolution, Truth, and the Nature of the Social. Boulder: Paradigm.

== Interviews ==
- "Interview of Maurice Bloch": Maurice Bloch interviewed by Alan Macfarlane on 29 May 2008
- "The Reluctant Anthropologist": Eurozine interview of Maurice Bloch by Maarja Kaaristo on 29 July 2007
