= Tobie Nathan =

French psychologist and writer (born 1948)

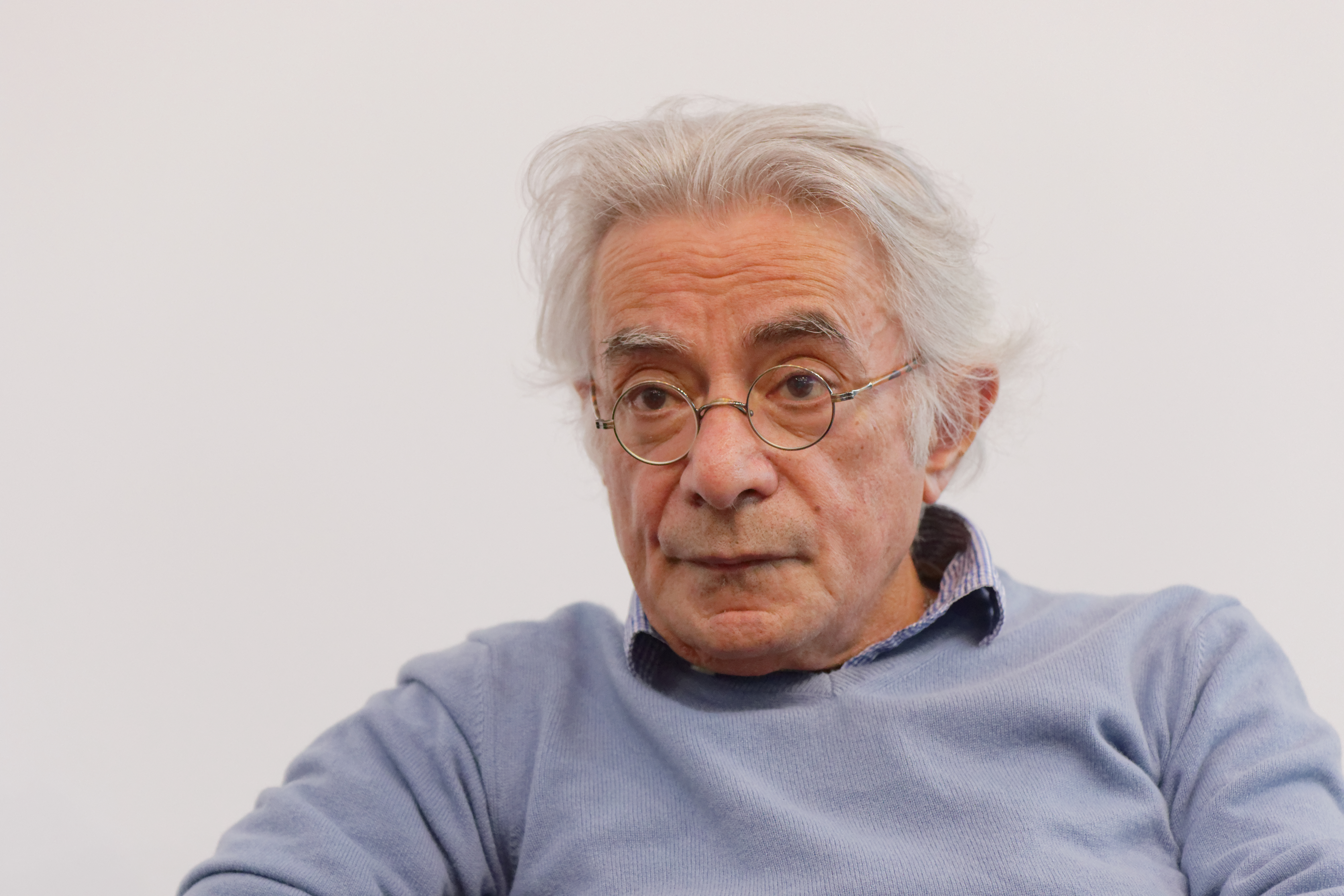
- Born: Aïd Nathan; November 10, 1948 (age 77); Cairo, Egypt
- Education: Paris Descartes University; Paris Nanterre University
- Awards: Ordre des Arts et des Lettres
- Scientific career
- Fields: Ethnopsychiatry
- Workplaces: Sorbonne Paris North University; Paris 8 University Vincennes-Saint-Denis
- Doctoral advisor: Georges Devereux; Didier Anzieu

Tobie Nathan (born November 10, 1948) is a French psychologist, professor emeritus of psychology at the University of Paris-VIII, diplomat, and writer. He is a specialist in the field of ethnopsychiatry.

Born in Egypt in 1948, his family had to leave Cairo in 1957 following the Egyptian revolution and the Jewish exodus from the Muslim world. They then moved to Italy and finally to France, where he studied and in which he obtained citizenship at the age of 21. In France, he chose to call himself Théophile, and eventually became known as Tobie.

Together with George Devereux, he founded the journal Ethnopsychiatrica in 1978. In 1979, Nathan and Devereux established the first ethno-psychiatry clinic; Nathan later founded the Centre Georges Devereux in 1988 in Saint-Denis with a linkage to the Universite Paris VII.

He earned a PhD in psychology in 1976 under the supervision of George Devereux, and another PhD in 1983.

His first novel, Saraka Bô, won the Prix Emmanuel Roblès in 1994. He won the Prix Femina Essai in 2012 for his autobiographical essay "Ethno-Roman". His novel A Land Like You was on the shortlist for the Goncourt Prize in 2015.

== Bibliography ==
- Saraka Bô (1994)
- A Land Like You (2015)
- Doctors and Healers (2018)
- To Sit on Earth: A Memoir (2024)
