= Richard K. Lublin =

American lawyer (born 1939)

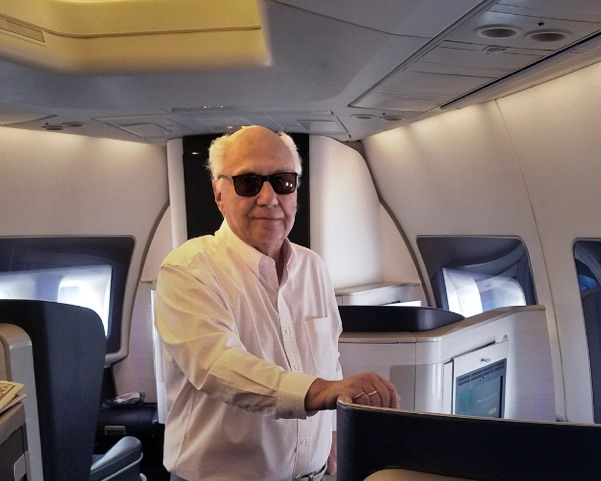
- Lublin, returning from the 69th Primetime Emmy Awards
- Born: October 15, 1939 (age 86); Hartford, Connecticut, U.S.
- Education: Duke University, Cornell Law School
- Occupations: Actor, Philanthropist, Lawyer (retired), Educator
- Spouses: Jane Lublin (died 2016); Christine Stahl Lublin (m. 2022)

Richard K. Lublin (born October 15, 1939) is an American lawyer and actor.

== Early life ==
Richard K. Lublin was born in Hartford, Connecticut. He received his B.A. from Duke University in 1961, and graduated from Cornell Law School with a Juris Doctor degree in 1964.

== Acting ==
Richard Lublin began his acting career in 1995 after retiring from 32 years of active law practice. His legal and acting careers merged in 1998 when he first landed roles as an attorney in The Practice and Ally McBeal. In the late 1990s, he played featured roles as a judge on Law & Order. Richard also had roles on highly popular television shows like Chicago Hope, Frasier, Rescue Me, Married with Children and the HBO series, Luck.

In his first movie role, Richard was cast in the Sidney Lumet film Before the Devil Knows You’re Dead, which movie critic Roger Ebert reviewed as “a superb crime melodrama.” In the film, Lublin plays “Mourner #4” and has dialog scenes with noted actors Albert Finney, Philip Seymour Hoffman, and Ethan Hawke.

In 2017, Richard performed in a feature film The Land of Steady Habits, written and directed by Nicole Holofcener. Set in Connecticut, the film focuses on the journey of Anders Hill, played by Ben Mendelsohn, a man in his mid-fifties who has just retired. Richard Lublin plays the role of Hill’s friendly neighbor, and has dialogue with the leading actor in several scenes, as Anders laments about the changes he’s experiencing along his journey.

In 2018, Lublin presided over the festivities and handed out awards during the closing night presentation at the International Film Festival in Naples, Florida where Steve Martin and Martin Short performed. Lublin again presented awards in 2021, marking his 4th year as presenting sponsor of the film festival. MovieMaker Magazine designated the Naples International Film Festival one of the “Top 25 Coolest Film Festivals In The World” in 2019. The Naples Philharmonic recognized Lublin’s support of the arts by inviting him to be a guest conductor in its annual pops concert. The 2025 Patriotic Pops concert marked Richard’s 3rd year as guest conductor of a piece during a special performance by the Naples Philharmonic. Richard Lublin is a member of the Screen Actors Guild and American Federation of Television and Radio Artists (SAG-AFTRA).

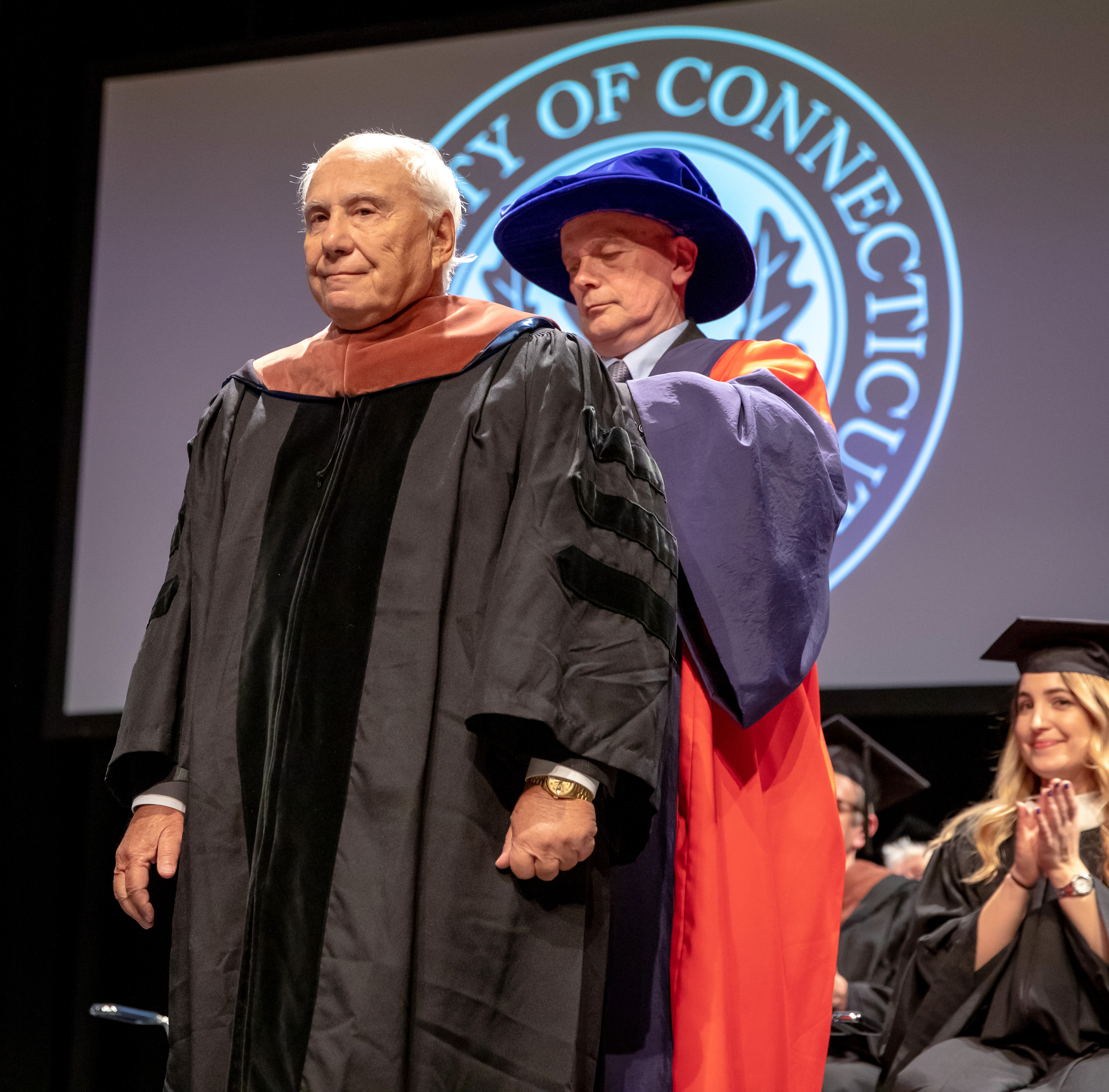
Richard Lublin receives Honorary Degree, Doctor of Fine Arts, from the University of Connecticut.

In May 2019, Richard Lublin was honored for bridging his two disparate careers in Law and the Arts. He received an Honorary Degree, Doctor of Fine Arts, from the University of Connecticut, School of Fine Arts during their commencement ceremony, where Richard was also the commencement speaker.

When the honorary doctorate was conferred, he was introduced with these remarks: “Today, we are privileged to honor you, Richard Lublin, as a representative of what can be achieved with drive, fortitude, and imagination. As an accomplished attorney and actor, your life’s work teaches us that with passion, there are no barriers to achievement.”

In 2026, Richard Lublin became a member of Pioneers and Legends, a community organization of accomplished leaders based in Naples, Florida.

== Filmography ==
Year	Title	Role	Type
2023	Curb Your Enthusiasm	Friend of Larry	Television
2017	The Land of Steady Habits	Friendly Neighbor	Film
2011	Luck	Race Track Official	Television
2009	Rescue Me	New York Fire Chief	Television
2007	Before the Devil Knows You're Dead	Mourner #4	Film
2004	Frasier	Coffee shop customer	Television
1999	Law & Order	Judge	Television
1998	Ally McBeal	Attorney	Television
1998	Chicago Hope	Cardiologist	Television
1998	Chicago Hope	Trauma Surgeon	Television
1998	The Practice	Attorney	Television
1997	Chicago Hope	ER Doctor Vincent Pellitier	Television
1996	Unhappily Ever After	Focus of joke	Television
1995	Married... with Children	Mall walker	Television

== Early career ==
After graduating from Cornell Law School, Richard Lublin was admitted to the Ohio State Bar Association in 1964 and the Connecticut Bar Association in 1965. He was admitted to practice before Connecticut’s U.S. District Court in 1969, the U.S. District Court for the Southern District of Florida in 1975 and the U.S. Court of Appeals for the Fifth Circuit in 1975. Lublin was a founding partner of a prominent Connecticut law firm, which had offices in East Hartford and Avon, Conn. He retired from active law practice in 1995.

Richard Lublin returned to his undergraduate alma mater, Duke University, as a guest lecturer in law from 1990-1995. He was a member of Duke University’s Advisory Board of Trustees from 1988 –1994.

== Philanthropy ==
In 1993, Lublin established the Richard K. Lublin Teaching Award as one of four endowed undergraduate teaching awards presented annually within Duke University’s Trinity College of Arts & Sciences. The Lublin Award recognizes undergraduate teaching excellence across all educational and research programs in the humanities, social sciences and natural sciences at Duke University. According to Duke Today, winners of the Lublin Scholarship and other teaching awards “use different approaches in different fields, but students and faculty colleagues said all share a passion for teaching, interest in innovative methods and give priority to developing their students’ capacity to think.” In October 2013, Lublin issued a national plea for other philanthropists to endow additional teaching awards at colleges and universities across the country. In 2024, April Henry, Duke University's Lecturer of German Studies, became the 38th recipient of the Richard K. Lublin Teaching Award. Bethzaida Fernandez, Senior Lecturer, Romance Studies was the award recipient in 2023. Dr. Kusum Knapcyzk, Duke University’s Trinity College of Arts & Sciences Lecturer of Hindi Language in the department of Asian and Middle Eastern Studies, was the 36th recipient in 2022. Kelly Alexander, Duke University’s Trinity College of Arts & Sciences Lecturing Fellow, Center for Documentary Studies, was the award recipient in 2021.

Other educational scholarships established by Lublin include: a student scholarship fund at Duke that awards a stipend to a graduating senior going on to law school, and a college scholarship award to a graduating high school senior in his hometown of Avon, Conn.

Much of Lublin’s philanthropic activity has been devoted to cancer and medical research. He and his late wife Jane made significant contributions to support cancer treatment and research at the Carole and Ray Neag Comprehensive Cancer Center at UConn Health. According to a 2010 UConn Foundation report, the couple’s gift “will support the work of leading clinician-scientists including Upendra Hegde, M.D.", an associate director of medical oncology in the melanoma program. Since 2010, the Lublins were title sponsors for UConn Health’s annual “White Coat Gala.” In 2017, Richard Lublin was the Founding Title Sponsor, in memory of Jane. The Lublins also annually sponsored the UConn Cancer Research Golf Tournament, which has raised millions of dollars for cancer research since it began.

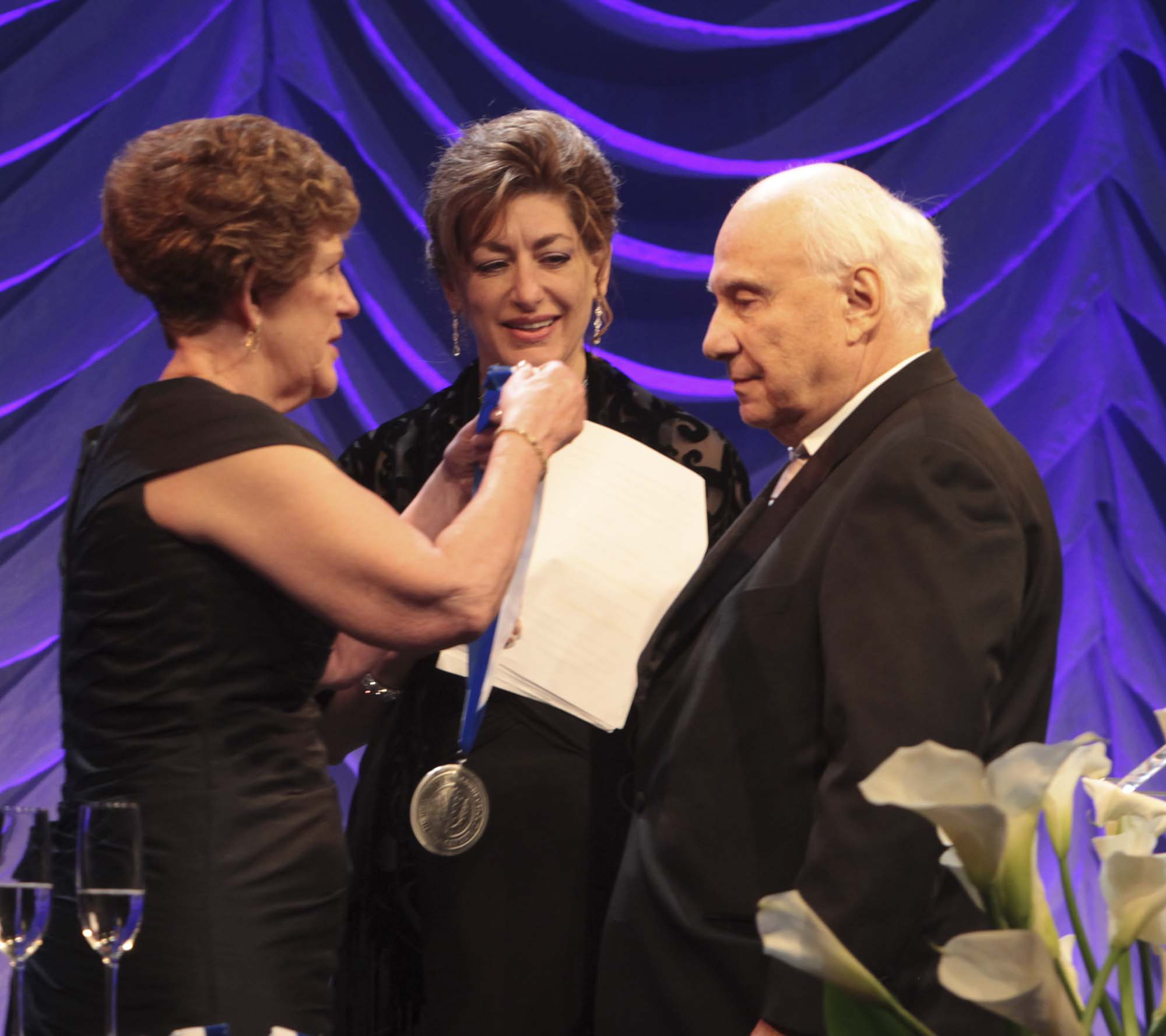
Carole Neag presents the Medal of Honor to Richard Lublin as the University of Connecticut President Susan Herbst looks on.

In recognition of their extraordinary philanthropic activity, the University of Connecticut bestowed one of its highest awards - the Carole and Ray Neag Medal of Honor - to Richard and Jane Lublin at its annual White Coat Gala held on April 12, 2014. After accepting the Medal of Honor, Richard Lublin said, "The act of giving, multiplied many times, can advance research to new levels in our efforts to eliminate cancer. We've seen what can happen when a great deal of money is given to battle a disease. The AIDS virus was once a death sentence, but adequate funding has allowed pharmaceutical companies and the medical profession to develop a treatment that allows patients to go on with their lives. More progress needs to be made with the hundreds of types of cancer." In February 2015, Richard Lublin was formally appointed as an inaugural member of the Dean’s Advisory Board at the UConn School of Medicine. His role on the Board is to assist the Dean in identifying and advancing the primary needs of the school for issues such as scholarship, research and faculty. In 2015, Lublin was also elected to the CT and Western MA Board of the American Heart Association to help guide the organization's mission and fundraising efforts.

Richard Lublin continued his active involvement in the fight against cancer as chairman of the 2018 American Cancer Society's (ACS) Naples, FL Annual Bucket List Gala. The American Cancer Society presented its inaugural Hope and Courage award to Lublin at the 2023 Bucket List Bash for demonstrating “great courage as a leader in our shared fight against cancer.” Since its inception in 2011, this prestigious fundraiser has grossed more than $15 million to support the nation's preeminent cancer-fighting organization. Richard and Christine Lublin are the presenting sponsors of the American Cancer Society’s 2027 Bucket List Bash in Naples, FL. The Lublins also co-chaired the event in 2022 and 2026. Funds raised help the ACS fund its mission to save and celebrate lives, and to lead the fight for a world without cancer. For the 2018 event, Lublin hired the legendary Diana Ross to attract donors. The successful fundraiser drew 500 attendees and raised more than one million dollars for the American Cancer Society. In 2018, Richard Lublin was elected as a member of the prestigious Laureate Society for making important strides in cancer care and cancer research. Members from the society review and evaluate grant requests for medical research annually to help determine the best investments.

In 1992, the Lublins established the Jane and Richard Lublin Research and Endowment Fund at the Lahey Clinic in Burlington, Mass. They later awarded the Lahey Clinic leadership gifts for research in prostate and bladder cancer, urology, and effective pain management for cancer and trauma patients. In 2014, the Lahey Clinic recognized the Lublins for their "22 years of philanthropic support of cancer research and pain management initiatives at the Lahey Hospital & Medical Center."

In 2012, they helped establish a research fund for cardiovascular surgery at Hartford Hospital in honor of Dr. Hiroyoshi Takata. Later that year, UConn Today reported that the Lublins made “the first philanthropic gift in support of Bioscience Connecticut initiatives at the UConn Health Center.” According to the Hartford Business Journal, Bioscience Connecticut is “the state’s $864 million attempt to reverse a two-decade-long jobs drought by creating a vibrant bioscience sector.” In recognition of the Lublins’ generosity, UConn Health named the new waiting room in the Carole and Ray Neag Comprehensive Cancer Center in their honor. In 1997 the Lublins honored the memory of Jane’s father, who died from cancer, by donating the cost of constructing the waiting room at the Davenport-Mugar Cancer Center at Cape Cod Hospital in Hyannis, Mass. A plaque displayed in the waiting room reads: “Given in memory of W. Victor Jensen by Richard and Jane Lublin.”
