= Ronald C. Simons =

American anthropologist

Ronald C. Simons (born June 25, 1935) is a psychiatrist and anthropologist best known for his work on latah, a culture-bound syndrome found predominantly in Malaysia and Indonesia. He has written on culture-bound syndromes more generally. He is professor of psychiatry and adjunct professor of anthropology at Michigan State University in East Lansing, Michigan. His short documentary film (produced with Gunter Pfaff), "Latah: A Culture-Specific Elaboration of the Startle Reflex" (1983) is a classic within medical anthropology.

== Selected publications ==
- Simons, Ronald C. (1980) "The resolution of the Latah paradox." J Nerv Ment Dis 168(4):195-206.
- Simons, Ronald C. (1983) "Latah II--problems with a purely symbolic interpretation. A reply to Michael Kenny." J Nerv Ment Dis 171(3):168-75.
- Simons, Ronald C. (1983) "Latah III--how compelling is the evidence for a psychoanalytic interpretation? A reply to H.B.M. Murphy." J Nerv Ment Dis 171(3):178-81.
- Simons, Rondald C; Hughes, Charles C, eds. (1985), The Culture-Bound Syndromes: Folk Illnesses and Anthropological Interest, Dordrecht, Holland & Boston US: D. Reidel Publishing Co, ISBN 90-277-1858-X Paperback ISBN 90-277-1859-8
- Simons, Ronald C. (1993) "A simple defense of Western biomedical explanatory schemata." Medical Anthropology 15(2):201-8.
- Simons, Ronald C. (1996) Boo! culture, experience, and the startle reflex. Oxford: Oxford University Press.
