= George Devereux =

Hungarian-French ethnologist

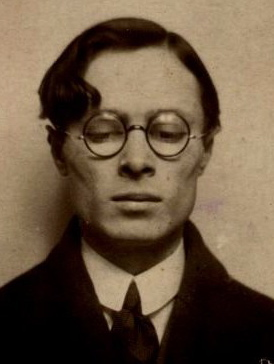
George Devereux

Georges Devereux (French: [dəvʁø]; born György Dobó, Hungarian: [ˈɟørɟ ˈdoboː]; 13 September 1908 – 28 May 1985) was a Hungarian-French ethnologist and psychoanalyst, often considered the founder of ethnopsychiatry.

He was born into a Jewish family in Lugoj, Banat, Austria-Hungary (now Romania). His family moved to France following World War I. He studied the Malayan language in Paris, completing work at the Institut d'Ethnologie. In 1933 he converted to Catholicism and changed his name to Georges Devereux. At that time, he traveled for the first time to the United States to do fieldwork among the Mohave Indians, completing his doctorate in anthropology at University of California at Berkeley in 1936. In the postwar years, Devereux became a psychoanalyst, working with the Winter Veterans Hospital and Menninger Clinic in Topeka, Kansas. He treated Native Americans by drawing on his anthropology background. A pioneer, he is "well regarded among French and American scholars interested in psychoanalytic anthropology".

Devereux taught at several colleges in the United States, returning to Paris about 1962 at the invitation of anthropologist Claude Levi-Strauss. He was appointed as director of studies of Section VI at the noted École pratique des hautes études (EPHE), later the École des hautes études en sciences sociales (EHESS), in Paris, where he worked from 1963 to 1981. In addition, he had a private clinical practice. Devereux published more than 400 texts. In 1993 the Centre George Devereux was founded in his honor at the University of Paris VIII, to offer care to students and people in the community.

His 1951 work, Reality and Dream, about his ethnopsychoanalysis of a Native American Blackfoot man, was adapted as a French film, Jimmy P: Psychotherapy of a Plains Indian (2013), written and directed by Arnaud Desplechin.

George Devereux is buried in the Colorado River Indian Tribes (CRIT) cemetery in Parker, Arizona. The land is the CRIT reservation.

== Biography ==
He was born György Dobó in 1908, in Lugoj, Banat, now in Romania and then part of Austria-Hungary. His family was Hungarian Jewish and bourgeois. His father was a lawyer, and his mother was of ethnic German Jewish background. Devereux had a rather difficult relationship with his mother. He said that the "insincerity of the adults", their "lack of respect for the world of the children" were formative experiences of his childhood and youth. His cousin was Edward Teller. As a youngster growing up in that imperial and cosmopolitan world, and later in France, Dobó learned and spoke four languages: Hungarian, Romanian, German, and French.

He studied piano seriously as a youth but, after an unsuccessful operation to correct a problem with his hand, had to give up his dream of performing professionally. His older brother committed suicide.

== Education and early career in France ==
Following the breakup of Austria-Hungary after World War I, the Dobó family left Romania for France. As a youth, Georgy studied chemistry and physics with Marie Curie in Paris. He was looking for ‘objective truth’ in physics and 'subjective truth' in music. In his later writings, he often referred to notions taken from the natural sciences.

He became ill and had to interrupt his studies. After recovering, Dobó moved to Leipzig, Germany, to begin an apprenticeship in a publishing house. He returned to Paris upon completion and, taking a new direction, enrolled at the École des langues orientales, known as INALCO, where he studied the Malay language, qualifying in 1931. He became a pupil of Marcel Mauss and Paul Rivet in anthropology, graduating from the Institut d'ethnologie.

He also befriended Klaus Mann. During this period, Dobó wrote a novel, Le faune dans l’enfer bourgeois (The Faun in the Bourgeois Hell), which has not been published.

From 1931 to 1935, Dobó worked at the Muséum national d'histoire naturelle (National Museum of Natural History) as a junior researcher. After completing his licence ès lettres, he received a grant/scholarship in 1932 from the Rockefeller Foundation in New York to do fieldwork in the United States.

== Work in the United States ==
He moved to the southwest, doing fieldwork among the Mohave, Hopi, Yuma, and Cocopa in the California, Nevada and Arizona areas. His early days in the United States proved to be difficult. "Among the young American anthropologists with whom he collaborated during his preparative stage he encountered only distrust and contempt; when, being asked about his teachers, he mentioned the names Mauss, Rivet and Lévy-Bruhl, he said.”

Devereux considered his time with the Mohave to have been the happiest of his life. This was the first of five periods when he lived with and studied them. He noted that they paid much attention to their dreams as a culture. He learned how they used interpretation to gain aid from their dreams. He said they "converted him to Freud".

In 1933 György Dobó converted to Catholicism, and adopted the French name of Georges Devereux. As part of his anthropology work, he later traveled to Indochina to live among and study the Sedang Moi. Devereux completed his PhD in anthropology in 1936 at the University of California-Berkeley, working under Alfred Kroeber.

Deeply interested in the use of dreams, Devereux decided to study psychoanalysis, still a new field of study in the United States. He was analyzed by Marc Schlumberger and Robert Jokl. He completed his analytical training in 1952 at the Topeka Institute of Psychoanalysis in Kansas, now part of the Menninger Clinic. In the early 21st century, the Clinic moved to Houston and became affiliated with Baylor College of Medicine.

From 1945 to 1953 Devereux was associated with the Winter Veterans Hospital in Topeka as ethnologist and research director. He treated and studied several Native Americans suffering from mental illness in this period, including Jimmy Picard, a Blackfoot whom he wrote about. He drew from his anthropology background to treat these men.

From 1953 to 1955 Devereux worked in Philadelphia, Pennsylvania with children and teenagers at the Devereux School (no relation to him). In 1956 he was appointed professor of ethnopsychiatry to the medical faculty of Temple University in that city. In 1959 he moved to New York City, where he taught ethnology at Columbia University. In this period, Devereux was finally accepted as a member of the American Psychoanalytic Association and also of the Société psychanalytique de Paris.

== Return to France ==
On the initiative of noted anthropologist Claude Lévi-Strauss, who had introduced structuralism to the field, Devereux was invited in 1963 to teach at Section VI of the École pratique des hautes études (EPHE) in Paris. Founded after World War II, the new section was devoted to Economic and Social Sciences. He became director of studies, and taught there until 1981. (Since 1975, this section spun off, founding the new École des hautes études en sciences sociales (EHESS). His chief work in methodology, From Anxiety to Method in the Behavioral Sciences, was published in 1967. Devereux also worked with private patients, and wrote and published extensively.

During the last years of his life, Devereux studied classical Greek history and culture. He published a book about the place of prophetic dreams in Greek tragedies.

== Methodology ==
In From Anxiety to Method in the Behavioral Sciences, Devereux suggested rethinking the question of the relationship between the observer and the observed. He based his concept on psychoanalysis. He believed that the researcher's goal of making his observations from a strictly objective point of view was impossible to practice and could be counterproductive. Instead the observer needed to be in the middle of the process and keep in mind that whatever he observed was always influenced by his own activity of observing.

He recognized that the only data to which the observer had access were his own perceptions, his reaction to reactions he provoked. According to Devereux, the observer must think about his relation to the observed in the same manner as an analyst would do in his relation to his analysand. The analyst works with the transference he triggers and with the countertransference he can perceive from the patient. In any study where the subject relates to the subjectivity of human beings (or even of animals), Devereux believed this process should be used.

In addition to using his own experiences, Devereux closely studied Claude Lévi-Strauss' Tristes tropiques [A World on the Wane], a classic work of his anthropology studies among indigenous peoples in Brazil; Georges Balandiers Afrique ambiguë [Ambiguous Africa: Cultures in Collision]; and Condominas' L'Exotique au quotidien. He described these as "[…] the only major attempts known to me to appraise the impact of his data and of his scientific activity upon the scientist". Devereux is considered among the group of French-speaking anthropologists who established new lines of research in the postwar period.

Together with a former student, Tobie Nathan, he founded the journal, Ethnopsychiatrica in the 1970s.

== Influence ==
According to George Gaillard, Devereux has been more influential in Europe than in North America in terms of ethnopsychiatry. Andrew and Harrit Lyons have assessed him as important in both France and the United States to those interested in psychoanalytic anthropology. Since the late 20th century, numerous American anthropologists have published studies that acknowledge and stress the subjectivity of researchers, noting they are in the middle and influence the work, as Devereux and Levi-Strauss noted. He also applied this insight to psychoanalysis.

In France, Tobie Nathan and Marie Rose Moro continue Devereux's ethnopsychiatric work, especially in psychotherapy with immigrants. In Switzerland the second generation of the "Zurich School" of ethnopsychoanalysis, Mario Erdheim, Maya Nadig, Florence Weiss, etc., has been deeply influenced by Devereux's methodological approach.

== Legacy ==
- Avicennes Hospital in France established the first clinic for ethnopsychiatry.
- 1993, the Centre George Devereux was founded in his honor at the University of Paris VIII, as part of the Psychology Department. It runs a clinic for ethnopsychiatry, aiding students as well as members of the community, including immigrants.
- His book, Reality and Dream: Psychotherapy of a Plains Indian (1951), about his psychoanalytic work with a Blackfoot Indian in the United States, was adapted as a French film, Jimmy P: Psychotherapy of a Plains Indian (2013), written and directed by Arnaud Desplechin, and starring Benicio del Toro as Jimmy Picard, and Mathieu Amalric as Georges Devereux. It was nominated for numerous awards, including three Césars.

== Writings (selection) ==
Devereux published more than 400 texts. Among them:

- Reality and Dream: Psychotherapy of a Plains Indian, New York: International Univ. Press, 1951
- A Study of Abortion in Primitive Societies; a typological, distributional, and dynamic analysis of the prevention of birth in 400 pre-industrial societies, New York: Julian Press, 1955
- From Anxiety to Method in the Behavioral Sciences, The Hague [etc..]: Mouton, 1967
- Mohave ethnopsychiatry and suicide: the psychiatric knowledge and the psychic disturbances of an Indian tribe, St. Clair Shores, Michigan: Scholarly Press, 1976
- Ethnopsychoanalysis: psychoanalysis and anthropology as complementary frames of reference, Berkeley: University of California Press, 1978
- Basic problems of ethnopsychiatry, Chicago: University of Chicago Press, 1980
- Dreams in Greek Tragedy: An Ethno-Psycho-Analytical Study, University of California Press, 1976
- Les Femmes et les psychotiques dans les sociétés traditionelles, (edited by Devereux), Paris 1981
- Femme et Mythe, Paris: Flammarion, 1982
- Baubo, la vulve mythique, Paris: J.-C. Godefroy, 1983
- The character of the Euripidean Hippolytos: an ethno-psychoanalytical study, Chico, Calif.: Scholars Press, 1985.
- Cléomène le roi fou. Etude d'histoire ethnopsychanalytique, Paris: Aubier Montaigne, 1998, ISBN 2-7007-2114-4
- correspondence Henri Ellenberger-George Devereux, in: Ethno-psychiatry (Emmanuel Delille ed.), Lyon, ENS Éditions, 2017. http://books.openedition.org/enseditions/7967

== See also ==
- Paul Parin
- Henri Ellenberger
