= Janis H. Jenkins =

Psychological and Medical anthropologist

Janis Hunter Jenkins is an American Psychological and Medical Anthropologist. She is Distinguished Professor at the University of California San Diego, on faculty in the Departments of Anthropology, Psychiatry, and the Global Health Program. She is Director for the Center for Global Mental Health at UCSD.

Jenkins' research has contributed to the fields of psychological/medical anthropology, cultural psychiatry, global mental health, and culture and emotion. Her research explores how cultural processes and structural institutions shape the experience, course, and outcome of mental health and illness. She has conducted interdisciplinary research among various populations including Mexican immigrants/migrants, Salvadoran refugees, Vietnamese and Iraqi Kurdish refugees, Puerto Rican migrants, Euro-American, Native-American, and African-American populations.

== Education ==
Janis H. Jenkins received her Ph.D. from the University of California, Los Angeles. She completed post-doctoral training as a Fellow in the NIMH-funded program entitled "Clinically Relevant Medical Anthropology" at Harvard Medical School.

== Career ==
Jenkins was appointed Assistant Research Anthropologist in The Department of Psychiatry and Biobehavioral Sciences at UCLA. She joined the faculty in the Department of Anthropology at Case Western Reserve University, and served as Director of the Women's Studies Program. She is currently a faculty member in the Departments of Anthropology and Psychiatry at UCSD, and Director of the Center for Global Mental Health.

Jenkins has been awarded several visiting and scholarly appointments including Visiting Scholar-in residence at the Russell Sage Foundation, Visiting Scholar at the Institute of Social Medicine, State University of Rio de Janeiro, Research Fellow at the American Philosophical Society, Member-in-Residence at the Institute for Advanced Study, Distinguished Visiting Faculty at Monash University, Melbourne, Australia, and Visiting Scholar for the Writing Residency of the Rockefeller Foundation Bellagio Center, Italy.

Jenkins has been recipient of the Young Investigator Award by the National Alliance for Research on Schizophrenia and Depression. She received the Stirling Award in 1990 by the Society for Psychological Anthropology for the article "Anthropology, Expressed Emotion, and Schizophrenia." She serves on the editorial board of Culture, Medicine, and Psychiatry: An International Journal of Cross-Cultural Comparative Research, and Ethos: Journal of the Society for Psychological Anthropology. She is the President of the American Anthropological Association's Society for Psychological Anthropology.

She has been awarded research funding from the U.S. National Institute of Mental Health as Principal Investigator for a study on "Sociocultural Factors and Course of Persistent Mental Illness, National Institute of Mental Health" (NIMH Grant MH 47920; 1990–1996) and "Culture, Schizophrenia, and Atypical Antipsychotics" (NIMH Grant R01 MH 60232; 1999–2004), Co-Investigator and Co-Principal Investigator, "Southwest Youth & Experience of Psychiatric Treatment" (NIMH Grant: R01 MH071781). Jenkins served as a member of three scientific review groups for NIMH ("Emotion and Personality," 1993–1994; "Social, Personality, & Group Processes," 1994–1998; and "Treatment and Services," 2003–2005).

In other sources of funding, Jenkins has been awarded research grants for studies on "Cultural Perceptions of Adolescent 'Bienestar Emocional' (Emotional Well-Being) and Patterns of Help Seeking: An Anthropological Study in Tijuana, Mexico" (University of California, San Diego, Faculty Senate Grant, 2016–2018); "Well-Being and Mental Health of Adolescents: Community Collaboration and Technological Innovations" (Grant C6009, Frontiers of Innovation Scholars Program, Office Research Affairs, University of California, San Diego, 2017–2020), as well as doctoral dissertation research grants from the National Science Foundation.

== Research ==
A primary focus of Jenkins' research has been the investigation of cultural meaning and lived experience of mental illness, and the empirical demonstration of how cultural and social structural features shape the course and outcome of mental health/illness.

Jenkins has worked with interdisciplinary research teams that have employed ethnographic and psychiatric methods of interviewing, observation, and assessment. She and her colleagues were first team to complete research to demonstrate the significant roles of "expressed emotion" (familial emotional response to an ill relative) in the course and outcome of schizophrenic illness among Spanish-speaking Mexican-descent families (Karno et al.,1987). This was the first study demonstrating that Mexican immigrants' familial emotional responses of warmth and sympathy toward mentally ill kin in the United States contributes to a more favorable course of illness than in the case of their Euro-American counterparts. Jenkins and her colleagues have theorized the research construct of "expressed emotion" as multidimensional features of cultural, psychological, biological, ecological, and political economic contexts (Jenkins & Karno, 1992).

Her cross-cultural and transnational studies have included adult and adolescent populations of Mexican, Mexican-American, Salvadoran, Puerto Rican, Euro-American, Vietnamese, African-American, and Native-American populations. These studies have been carried out in home and community settings, including both in-patient and out-patient treatment facilities. Types of illness conditions studied have ranged from psychotic-related conditions, to depression, anxiety, and psychological trauma. Jenkins' research teams have found that the social and cultural environment of a person living with a mental illness can also shape the societal stigma and discrimination commonly associated with such conditions and treatments such as experiences with antipsychotic medication.

Jenkins formulated the concept of "extraordinary conditions" elaborated in her book, Extraordinary Conditions: Culture and Experience in Mental Illness. This book, along with her subsequent co-authored title, Troubled in The Land of Enchantment: Adolescent Experience of Psychiatric Treatment, explore the cultural shaping of psychological distress, the impress of conditions of structural violence, the fundamental human capacity for struggle, and cultural conceptions of 'the problem' (which would be clinically diagnosed as mental disorder) in relation to cultural orientations toward normality/abnormality and the ordinary/extraordinary in everyday human experience. Jenkins' research has drawn together the centrality of engaged struggle –rather than symptoms - as fundamental to human capacity and experience.

Jenkins' ethnographic research conducted in environments of political violence has elucidated the role of the nation-state in constructing what she terms "a political ethos," defined as "culturally organized feeling and sentiment pertaining to social domains of power and interest" (Jenkins, 1991, p. 140). These studies have identified several culturally specific bodily transactions of emotions, such as the experience of el calor (intense heat) among Salvadoran refugees and nervios among Mexican-American populations. Jenkins works to promote interdisciplinary research and intervention for global mental health on a broad scale for all worldwide.

== Selected publications ==
=== Books ===
- Jenkins, Janis H., & Csordas, Thomas J. (2020). Troubled in the land of enchantment: adolescent experience of psychiatric treatment. Oakland: University of California Press.
- Jenkins, Janis H. (2015). Extraordinary conditions: Culture and experience in mental illness. Oakland: University of California Press.
- Jenkins, Janis H. (2011). Pharmaceutical Self: The Global Shaping of Experience in an Age of Psychopharmacology. Santa Fe, New Mexico: School of Advanced Research Press.
- Jenkins, Janis H., & Robert J. Barrett. (2004). Schizophrenia, Culture, and Subjectivity: The Edge of Experience. Cambridge: Cambridge University Press.

=== Articles ===
- Jenkins, J.H. (1991) The 1990 Society for Psychological Anthropology, American Anthropological Association, Stirling Award Essay: Anthropology, Expressed Emotion, and Schizophrenia. Ethos: The Journal of the Society for Psychological Anthropology 19:387-431.
- Jenkins, J.H. (1991) The State Construction of Affect: Political Ethos and Mental Health among Salvadoran Refugees. Culture, Medicine, and Psychiatry 15:139-165. Reprinted in 2010 in A Reader in Medical Anthropology: Theoretical Trajectories, Emergent Realities, B.J. Good, M. Fischer, S. Willen, and M.J. DelVecchio Good, Eds. Wiley-Blackwell.
- Jenkins, J.H. & Karno. M. (1992) The Meaning of "Expressed Emotion:" Theoretical Issues Raised by Cross-Cultural Research. Special Article in American Journal of Psychiatry 149: 9-21.
- Jenkins, J.H. (2018) Anthropology and Psychiatry: A Contemporary Convergence for Global Mental Health. In Textbook of Cultural Psychiatry, Second Edition. Dinesh Bhugra and Kamaldeep Bhui, Eds. United Kingdom: Cambridge University.
- Jenkins, J. H., Sanchez, G., & Lidia Olivas-Hernández, O. (2020). Loneliness, adolescence, and global mental health: Soledad and structural violence in Mexico. Transcultural psychiatry, 57(5), 673–687.
- Jenkins, J.H. (2025). Orientation and atmosphere: Toward an anthropology of political subjectivity. Ethos e70023. https://doi.org/10.1111/etho.70023
