= A. Kimball Romney =

American anthropologist (1925–2023)

Antone Kimball Romney Jr.
- Born: August 15, 1925; Rexburg, Idaho
- Died: December 29, 2023 (aged 98); Irvine, California
- Occupation: Social Sciences Professor at University of California, Irvine
- Years active: (1969 – 1995)
- Spouse: Afton Romaine Barber (m. 1945; died 2022)
- Children: 5
- Relatives: Romney family

Academic work
- Discipline: Anthropologist
- Sub-discipline: Cognitive anthropology

Antone Kimball Romney (August 15, 1925 – December 29, 2023) was an American social sciences professor and one of the founders of cognitive anthropology. He spent most of his career at the University of California, Irvine.

== Early life and education ==
Romney was born in Rexburg, Idaho on August 15, 1925 to Antone Kimball Romney and Gretta Parkinson Romney. He received his B.A. from Brigham Young University (1947) in sociology, his M.A. from Brigham Young University (1948) also in sociology, and his Ph.D. from Harvard University (1956) in Social Anthropology from the Social Relations Department.

== Professional career ==
From 1955 to 1956, Romney was an assistant professor at the University of Chicago. From 1957 to 1960 he was an assistant professor at Stanford University. From 1960 to 1966, he was an associate professor at Stanford University. From 1960 to 1965 he was the director of anthropological research at Stanford University. From 1966 to 1968 he was a professor at Harvard University. From 1969 to 1971, he was the dean of the School of Social Sciences at the University of California, Irvine. From 1969 to 1995, he was a professor at University of California, Irvine. From 1995, he was a research professor at University of California, Irvine. From 1956 to 1957 he was a fellow at the Center for Advanced Study in the Behavioral Sciences Department at Stanford. From 1994, he was a fellow at the American Academy of Arts and Sciences. From 1995, he was a member of the National Academy of Sciences.

== Personal life and death ==
Romney married Afton Romaine Barber on June 30, 1945, in Denver, Colorado. Together, they had 5 children. Romaine died in Irvine, California on December 27, 2022, at the age of 97. Romney died in Irvine, California on December 29, 2023 at the age of 98.
