= Cognitive anthropology =

Branch of anthropology

Cognitive anthropology is a subfield of anthropology influenced by linguistic anthropology, cultural anthropology, and biological anthropology in which scholars seek to explain patterns of shared knowledge, cultural innovation, and transmission over time and space using the methods and theories of the cognitive sciences (especially experimental psychology and cognitive psychology) often through close collaboration with historians, ethnographers, archaeologists, linguists, musicologists, and other specialists engaged in the description and interpretation of cultural forms. Cognitive anthropology is concerned with what people from different groups know and how that implicit knowledge, in the sense of what they think subconsciously, changes the way people perceive and relate to the world around them.

== History ==
Cognitive anthropology arose as part of efforts designed to understand the relationship between language and thought, with linguistic anthropologists of North America in the 1950s spearheading the effort to approach cognition in cultural contexts, rather than as an effort to identify or assume cognitive universals.

Cognitive anthropology became a current paradigm of anthropology under the new ethnography or ethnoscience paradigm that emerged in American anthropology toward the end of the 1950s.

== Scope ==
Cognitive anthropology studies a range of domains including folk taxonomies, the interaction of language and thought, and cultural models.

From a linguistics stand-point, cognitive anthropology uses language as the doorway to study cognition. Its general goal is to break language down to find commonalities in different cultures and the ways people perceive the world. Linguistic study of cognitive anthropology may be broken down into three subfields: semantics, syntactics, and pragmatics.

Cognitive anthropology is separated in two categories, thought in society/culture and language. Thought is concerned with the procedure and outcome of thoughts. The thinking process in cognitive anthropology puts the importance of culture at the center of examining thoughts. Cognitive anthropologists believe that cultural meanings arise when people learn, create, interpret and apply these collective representations. Reapplication and representations reinforce the experienced patterns through the process of implementing appropriateness and relevance, contain the elements for cognitive reorganization and creativity in behavior and understanding.

In cognitive anthropology language is seen as an important source for analyzing thinking processes. Cognitive anthropology analyzes cultural views with lexicons as the primary source of data that researches search for definite beliefs, implicit understandings and category systems.

== Methods ==
Cognitive anthropology uses quantitative measures as well as the traditional ethnographic methods of cultural anthropology in order to study culture. Because of the field's interest in determining shared knowledge, consensus analysis has been used as its most widely used statistical measure.

One of the techniques used is Cultural Network Analysis, the drawing of networks of interrelated ideas that are widely shared among members of a population. Recently there has been some interchange between cognitive anthropologists and those working in artificial intelligence.

== Key concepts ==
Cultural consonance - the concept refers to the degree to which people’s activities match their beliefs about how they should be.

Cultural models are the unconscious set of assumptions and understandings members of a society or group share. They significantly affect people’s understanding of the world and of human behavior.

Domain is the organized set of words, concepts, or sentences, all on the same level of contrast that jointly refers to a single conceptual sphere.

Psychic unity of mankind is Bastian’s idea that all humans must have the same basic psychic or mental processes, and that this unity produces similar responses to similar stimuli.

Prototypes are conventional reference points in making judgments of the similarities and differences in other experiences and things in the world.

Schemata is a culturally specific mental structure responsible for an active organization of past experiences, implying activation of the whole. Remembering is guided by this mental structure.

Shared knowledge is publicly shared meanings about the world, which implies not merely knowing something but also knowing something to be widely known by the other group members. Cultural knowledge is shared, but too large to be held by a single individual, and thus unevenly distributed. The concept was developed by A. Kimball Romney, William Batchelder, and Susan Weller in the 1980s.

== Relation with cognitive science ==
Cognitive anthropology intersects with several other fields within its parent cultural anthropology sphere. Whereas cultural anthropologists had always sought to identify and organize certain salient facets of culture, cognitive anthropologists appreciate the reflexive nature of their study. Instead of analyzing facets of culture as they appear to the anthropologist, they place special emphasis on emic viewpoints of culture to understand what motivates different populations, eventually coming to an understanding of universal cognition. These goals form the basis of the argument merging cognitive anthropology and cognitive science.

Cognitive anthropology is linked to psychology because studying the way social groups reason and categorize raises questions about the basic nature of cognitive processes. Concepts of cognitive anthropology (e.g., Cultural consonance, Cultural models, Knowledge structures, Shared knowledge etc., see below) rely heavily on unconscious interactions within a group that manifest themselves from the very beginning of life in unconscious interactions in interpersonal dynamics. In cognitive sciences, mechanisms of unaware knowledge assimilation in young children are described by the notion of shared intentionality. Growing evidence in Neuroscience research supports these arguments by revealing the effects of neuroplasticity on the brain´s development, which are mediated by both environmental and historically dependent mechanisms that shape the nervous system.

=== Advocacy ===
Advocate and presidential researcher Giovanni Bennardo put forth three categories of data in 2013 that warrant this grouping. Cognitive anthropologists gather ethnographic, linguistic, and experimental data, which is then analyzed quantitatively. For example, medical rituals provide more direct data that informs linguistic analysis and a greater insight into cognitive motivations, hence the field’s similarity to linguistic relativism. To advocates, the mind is a cultural facet (as is kinship to the pioneering cultural anthropologist) that generates language, which provides insight into human cognition.

Other advocates for cognitive anthropology’s categorization with cognitive science have pointed out that cognitive psychology fails to encompass several fields that cognitive anthropology does, hence its pivotal role in cognitive science. Professor of Psychology at University of Connecticut, James S. Boster, points out in the Journal of the Cognitive Science Society that while cognitive psychology studies a human’s thought process, cognitive anthropology studies what exactly different humans ponder—what they sense and perceive of their own culture and surroundings in different settings.

=== Criticism ===
There has been longtime conflict between cognitive scientists and cognitive anthropologists on the intersection of their respective fields. The grouping has received much backlash in the literature, such as from Edward Evans-Pritchard on the basis of methodology and subject matter.

Cognitive psychologists have criticized cognitive anthropologists for their chaotic research methods, such as forming instruments of observation and data acquisition using language that natives use in their interviews with fieldworkers. "CA has been alienated from the rest of cultural anthropology because it is seen as too quantitative and scientific for the prevailing post‐modern aesthetic, while at the same time seen as too ethnographic and natural historical for the tastes of CP."

Some cognitive scientists have devalued anthropology's influence in the cognitive sciences, which was extensively discussed by Sieghard Beller, Andrea Bender, and Douglas Medin in the Journal of the Cognitive Science Society. In their widely cited journal article, they attribute this rejection to cognitive anthropology's lack of credibility as a subset of the psychological sciences, focus on common narratives throughout different cultures rather than on the individual mind, and difficulty of getting published. "They strive for insights that explain something about the human mind in general and therefore consider cross‐cultural comparisons as just one means to test assumptions on universals."

Critics have also disputed the scientific nature of cognitive anthropology in general and argued that it studies content of thought rather than process, which cognitive science centers on. Resistance from more established subfields of cultural anthropology has historically restricted resources and tenure for cognitive anthropologists.

== See also ==
- A. Kimball Romney
- Cognitive model § Mother-fetus cognitive model
- Cognitive archaeology
- Componential analysis
- Distributed cognition
- Edwin Hutchins
- Evolutionary anthropology
- Frederick L. Coolidge
- Lambros Malafouris
- Maurice Bloch
- Merlin Donald
- Neuroanthropology
