= John Heron (social scientist) =

British psychologist (1928–2022)

- Born: 24 September 1928
- Died: 28 November 2022 (aged 94); Bristol, UK
- Occupation: Social scientist
- Known for: Co-operative inquiry, co-counselling

John Heron (24 September 1928 – 28 November 2022) was a transpersonal psychologist who pioneered a participatory action research method called co-operative inquiry. He began developing this method in the late 1960s based on his work related to affective aspects of interpersonal experiences and the phenomenology of social encounter. Practitioners in many interdisciplinary fields, including in adult education, have applied this method in as a way of collaboratively facilitating professional and personal development goals. He saw the process of co-operative inquiry, in whatever field it is applied, as a basic form of relational and participative spiritual practice.

== Career ==
Heron was the founder and director of the Human Potential Research Project at the University of Surrey from 1970 to 1977. This was the first university-based centre for humanistic and transpersonal psychology and education in Europe. He was assistant director of the British Postgraduate Medical Federation at the University of London from 1977 to 1985, in charge of an innovative programme of personal and professional development for hospital doctors and GPs. His work there included facilitating a co-operative inquiry into whole-person medicine, out of which the British Holistic Medical Association was formed. He was the director of the International Centre for Co-operative Inquiry at Volterra, Tuscany, Italy, from 1990 to 2000, where radical forms of spiritual inquiry were developed. He was co-director of the South Pacific Centre for Human Inquiry at Auckland, New Zealand from 2000 to 2022, focussing on long-term co-operative inquiries into charismatic and relational spiritual practices.

Heron was a group facilitator and trainer in the fields of co-counselling (in 1974 he was one of the founders of Co-Counselling International after a split from the Re-evaluation Counseling of Harvey Jackins), co-operative inquiry and new paradigm research, educational and staff development, group facilitation and interactive skills, management development, personal and transpersonal development, professional development in medicine, psychotherapy and the helping professions. He was also a researcher and author.

Heron was a group facilitator on UK TV programmes on the following topics: medical stress (ITV, 1981), racism (BBC2, 1985), AIDS (Channel 4, 1987), Salman Rushdie's The Satanic Verses (BBC2, 1990), divorce (BBC2, 1991), parents and teenagers (BBC1, 1994).

One of the founders in the UK of each of the following: Association of Humanistic Psychology Practitioners, Co-counselling International, Institute for the Development of Human Potential, New Paradigm Research Group, Research Council for Complementary Medicine.

== Death ==
John Heron died on 28 November 2022 in Bristol, UK, aged 94.

== Books ==
- Feeling and Personhood: Psychology in Another Key (London, Sage, 1992)
- Co-operative Inquiry: Research into the Human Condition (London, Sage, 1996)
- Sacred Science: Person-centred Inquiry into the Spiritual and the Subtle (Ross-on-Wye, PCCS Books, 1998)
- The Complete Facilitator's Handbook (London, Kogan Page, 1999).
- Helping the Client: A Creative Practical Guide fifth edition (London, Saqe, 2001)
- Participatory Spirituality: A Farewell to Authoritarian Religion (New Zealand, Lulu Press, 2007)
