= D. Jean Clandinin =

Scholar in education and narrative inquiry

Dorothy Jean Clandinin is a Canadian scholar known for her contributions to educational research and narrative inquiry. She is professor emerita and the founding director of the Centre for Research for Teacher Education and Development at the University of Alberta. Clandinin previously served as the vice president of Division B (Curriculum Studies) of the American Educational Research Association (AERA).

Clandinin has received multiple awards for her teaching and research, including AERA's Early Career Award (1993), Canadian Education Association Whitworth Award (1999), Kaplan Research Achievement Award (2001), AERA's Division B Lifetime Achievement Award (2002), the University of Alberta's Larry Beauchamp Award (2008), Killam Mentoring Award (2009), AERA's Lives of Teachers SIG's Michael Huberman Award for Outstanding Scholarship (2013), AERA's Division K Legacy Award (2015), and International Study Association of Teachers and Teaching STAR award.

Clandinin began her career as an educator, spending 10 years in schools as a "teacher, counsellor, and special programs teachers" before beginning her doctorate at the University of Toronto's Ontario Institute for Studies in Education, where she worked with scholars such as Mark Johnson and Frank Smith.

Clandinin has worked closely with F. Michael Connelly, with whom she is credited for coining the term 'narrative inquiry'.

== Books ==
=== As author ===
- Clandinin, D. Jean (1986). Classroom Practice: Teacher Images in Action. Falmer Press. ISBN 978-1-85-000037-2.
- Connelly, F. Michael; Clandinin, D. Jean (1988). Teachers as Curriculum Planners: Narratives of Experience. Teachers College Press. ISBN 978-0-80-772906-9.
- Clandinin, D. Jean (1993). Learning to Teach, Teaching to Learn: Stories of Collaboration in Teacher Education. Teachers College Press. ISBN 978-0-80-773223-6.
- Clandinin, D. Jean; Connelly, F. Michael (1995). Teachers' Professional Knowledge Landscapes. Teachers College Press. ISBN 978-0-80-773419-3.
- Clandinin, D. Jean; Connelly, F. Michael (1999). Narrative Inquiry: Experience and Story in Qualitative Research. Jossey-Bass. ISBN 978-0-78-794343-1.
- Connelly, F. Michael; Clandinin, D. Jean (1999). Shaping a Professional Identity: Stories of Educational Practice. Teachers College Press. ISBN 978-0-80-773848-1.
- Clandinin, D. Jean; Huber, Janice; Huber, Marilyn Huber; Murphy, M. Shaun; Murray-Orr, Anne; Pearce, Marni; Steeves, Pam (2006). Composing Diverse Identities: Narrative Inquiries into the Interwoven Lives of Children and Teachers. Routledge. ISBN 978-0-41-539747-6.
- Huber, Janice; Clandinin, D. Jean; Murphy, M. Shaun (2011). Places of Curriculum Making: Narrative Inquiries Into Children's Lives in Motion. Emerald Group Publishing. ISBN 978-0-85-724827-5.
- Clandinin, D. Jean (2013). Engaging in Narrative Inquiry. Left Coast Press. ISBN 978-1-61-132159-3.
- Clandinin, D. Jean; Caine, Vera; Lessard, Sean; Huber, Janice (2016). Engaging in Narrative Inquiries with Children and Youth. Routledge. ISBN 978-1-62-958218-4.
- Clandinin, D. Jean; Caine, Vera; Lessard, Sean (2018). The Relational Ethics of Narrative Inquiry. Taylor & Francis. ISBN 978-1-35-197710-4.
- Clandinin, D. Jean (2019). Journeys in Narrative Inquiry: The Selected Works of D. Jean Clandinin. Routledge. ISBN 978-0-36-722228-4.
- Caine, Vera; Clandinin, D. Jean; Lessard, Sean (2021). Narrative Inquiry: Philosophical Roots. Bloomsbury Publishing. ISBN 978-1-35-014206-0.

=== As editor ===
- Clandinin, D. Jean, ed. (2006). Handbook of Narrative Inquiry: Mapping a Methodology. SAGE Publications. ISBN 978-1-41-291562-5.
- Clandinin, D. Jean; Steeves, Pam; Caine, Vera, eds. (2013). Composing Lives in Transition: A Narrative Inquiry into the Experiences of Early School Leavers. Emerald Publishing. ISBN 978-1-78-052974-5.
- Husu, Jukka; Clandinin, D. Jean, eds. (2017). The SAGE Handbook of Research on Teacher Education. SAGE Publications. ISBN 978-1-52-641546-2.
