= Kirk J. Schneider =

American psychologist and psychotherapist

Kirk J. Schneider is an American psychologist, psychotherapist, educator, and author known for his contributions to existential-humanistic psychology, existential-integrative psychotherapy, applications of existential psychology to social issues, and the psychology of awe. Building on the work of existential psychologists such as Rollo May and James F. T. Bugental, Schneider's scholarship has examined the roles of anxiety, meaning, uncertainty, and human experience in psychotherapy and psychological well-being.

He has authored or edited 16 books, including The Paradoxical Self, The Psychology of Existence (with Rollo May), Rediscovery of Awe, Existential-Integrative Psychotherapy, Existential-Humanistic Therapy (with Orah Krug), The Polarized Mind, The Depolarizing of America, Life-Enhancing Anxiety, and The Vibrant Center: A New Consciousness for Our Broken Age (2026), which synthesizes his work on existential psychology, democratic dialogue, and contemporary social and cultural challenges. He is a cofounder and current president of the Existential-Humanistic Institute, a past president of the Society for Humanistic Psychology (Division 32) of the American Psychological Association, and former editor-in-chief of the Journal of Humanistic Psychology.

He has served in leadership roles within the American Psychological Association (APA), including as Fellow in seven APA Divisions, Council Member for the Society for Humanistic Psychology, Candidate for president-elect of the APA, and president of the Society for Humanistic Psychology (Division 32). He also held academic appointments at Saybrook University and Teachers College, Columbia University. In recent years, his work has increasingly focused on political polarization, democratic dialogue, and the application of existential psychology to contemporary social challenges.

== Education ==
Schneider earned a Bachelor of Arts in psychology with a minor in philosophy from The Ohio State University in 1978. He completed a Master of Arts in psychology at West Georgia College (now the University of West Georgia) in 1979 and received a PhD in clinical psychology from Saybrook Institute (now Saybrook University) in 1984, specializing in humanistic psychotherapies.

During his graduate and postgraduate training, Schneider completed clinical placements in suicide prevention, family therapy, community mental health, psychiatric emergency services, a state hospital, and psychotherapy. He also trained under one of the chief founders of existential-humanistic psychotherapy James F. T. Bugental, whose work, along with that of Rollo May, became a major influence on Schneider's later development of existential-integrative psychotherapy.

== Career ==
Following completion of his doctoral training, Schneider worked as a staff psychologist in community mental health and hospital settings before establishing a private psychotherapy practice in Boston. Subsequently, Schneider relocated to San Francisco in 1989 where he has maintained a clinical practice in existential-humanistic and existential-integrative psychotherapy, where he founded the Center for Existential Therapy and has maintained a clinical practice specializing in existential-humanistic and existential-integrative psychotherapy.

Alongside his clinical work, Schneider has held numerous academic appointments as an adjunct faculty member at institutions including Saybrook University, the California Institute of Integral Studies, Teachers College, Columbia University, Lesley University, and several other graduate psychology programs. He has also served as a visiting lecturer and keynote speaker at universities and professional conferences throughout North and South America, Europe, and Asia.

In 1997, Schneider co-founded the Existential-Humanistic Institute (EHI), a psychotherapy training organization dedicated to advancing existential-humanistic psychology. He has served in several leadership roles within the institute, including vice president and president, and helped establish one of the first certificate programs in existential-humanistic psychotherapy in the United States. The institute received the Charlotte and Karl Bühler Award from the American Psychological Association's Society for Humanistic Psychology in 2016 in recognition of its contributions to the field.

Since the late 2010s, Schneider's professional work has increasingly focused on applying existential psychology to contemporary social and political issues. He became a trained dialogue moderator with Braver Angels (formerly Better Angels) and further developed the Experiential Democracy Dialogue initiative. Together with Tyler Gamlen, he co-founded the Corps of Depth Healers, an educational initiative promoting "emotionally restorative relationships" to address social crises throughout the U.S. This initiative emphasizes cross-cultural dialogue, existential-humanistic education, and community engagement through certificate programs, podcasts, and digital media.

== Research and theoretical contributions ==
=== Existential-humanistic psychology ===
Schneider is regarded as one of the principal contemporary representatives of existential-humanistic psychology. His scholarship extends traditions developed by Rollo May, James Bugental, and other humanistic psychologists while integrating existential philosophy with contemporary psychotherapy research. His work emphasizes the individual's encounter with uncertainty, mortality, responsibility, and meaning as central dimensions of psychological and social health.

A recurring theme throughout Schneider's scholarship is the belief that psychological growth emerges not through avoiding anxiety or uncertainty but through engaging them constructively. He has argued that existential awareness can promote resilience, creativity, and greater openness to experience rather than merely functioning as a source of distress.

=== Existential-integrative psychotherapy ===
Schneider helped develop existential-integrative psychotherapy, an approach combining existential-humanistic principles with other empirically supported therapeutic methods drawn from multiple psychological traditions. Rather than emphasizing a single theoretical orientation, the model integrates relational, experiential, cognitive, psychodynamic, behavioral and medical interventions according to individual client needs while maintaining existential concerns as its conceptual foundation.

His work in this area culminated in Existential-Integrative Psychotherapy and Existential-Humanistic Therapy, the latter co-authored with Orah Krug and accompanied by an American Psychological Association psychotherapy training video.

=== Psychology of awe ===
Beginning in the early 2000s, Schneider's research increasingly examined the psychological significance of awe. In books such as Rediscovery of Awe, Awakening to Awe, and The Spirituality of Awe, he proposed that awe represents a fundamental human capacity arising from encounters with mystery, beauty, uncertainty, and transcendence. He argued that cultivating awe can counteract psychological rigidity, excessive certainty, and narcissism while fostering openness, humility, creativity, and resilience. This theme has become one of the defining features of his scholarship.

=== The polarized mind ===
Schneider later extended existential psychology into the study of political and cultural conflict through his concept of the polarized mind. Introduced in The Polarized Mind (2013), the theory proposes that ideological extremism originates in existential fear and uncertainty, leading individuals and groups to adopt rigid, exclusionary worldviews. Schneider argued that polarization should be understood not only as a political phenomenon but also as a psychological and cultural process rooted in anxiety, identity, and the human search for certainty. The concept has been further developed in journal articles addressing the limitations of conventional psychiatric diagnosis and advocating broader cultural approaches to psychological suffering.

=== Existential psychology and democracy ===
Since the late 2010s, Schneider's research has increasingly focused on democratic dialogue and civic engagement. Drawing upon existential-humanistic principles, he has developed the Experiential Democracy Dialogue, a structured dialogue model intended to foster empathy, self-reflection, and communication across ideological divisions. His work in this area informed The Depolarizing of Americaand has been associated with his participation in dialogue initiatives including Braver Angels and, later, the Corps of Depth Healers.

=== Anxiety, technology, and contemporary society ===
A recurring theme in Schneider's later work is the relationship between existential anxiety and contemporary technological culture. In Life-Enhancing Anxiety and The Vibrant Center, he argues that anxiety should not always be viewed as a disorder to eliminate but as a potentially constructive response to uncertainty that can promote creativity, ethical reflection, and personal growth. He has also examined the effects of technological culture and automation on human identity, warning that an overreliance on mechanistic thinking may diminish empathy, depth, and democratic engagement. The erosion of a sense of agency is also core to his work.

=== The Vibrant Center and later work ===
Schneider's recent scholarship has increasingly focused on applying existential-humanistic psychology to contemporary social, cultural, and political challenges. Building upon themes developed in The Polarized Mind (2013), The Depolarizing of America (2023), and Life-Enhancing Anxiety (2024), he has argued that anxiety, uncertainty, and existential awareness can become resources for personal growth and democratic renewal rather than conditions to be eliminated.

His 2026 book, The Vibrant Center: A New Consciousness for Our Broken Age, brings together these themes into a broader framework for addressing polarization, technological change, ecological uncertainty, and social fragmentation. The book synthesizes Schneider's longstanding research on existential psychology, awe, dialogue, and human development, arguing for what he describes as a "vibrant center" grounded in openness to paradox, emotional depth, and democratic engagement. It also incorporates his recent work on the Experiential Democracy Dialogue model and the Corps of Depth Healers initiative, extending existential-humanistic psychology beyond psychotherapy into civic and cultural life.

== Publications ==
=== Books ===
- Schneider, K.J. (1990/1999, 2nd paperback ed.). The paradoxical self: Toward an understanding of our contradictory nature. Buffalo, NY: Prometheus Press/ Humanity Books. (Originally published by Plenum/Insight.) [Translated into Portuguese and Slovak; currently being translated into Chinese Short Form]. [All books to follow are currently being translated into Chinese Short Form]
- Schneider, K.J. (1993). Horror and the holy: Wisdom-teachings of the monster tale. Chicago: Open Court.
- Schneider, K.J., & May, R. (1995). The psychology of existence: An integrative, clinical perspective. New York: McGraw-Hill. [Translated in 2010 into Chinese Short Form, Chinese People's University Press]
- Schneider, K.J., Bugental, J.F.T., & Pierson, J.F. (2001). The handbook of humanistic psychology: Leading edges in theory, research, and practice. Thousand Oaks: Sage. (Reprinted in paperback, August 2002). The second edition of "The handbook" was published in 2015.
- Schneider, K.J. (2004). Rediscovery of awe: Splendor, mystery, and the fluid center of life. St. Paul, MN: Paragon House.
- Schneider, K.J. (2008). Existential-integrative psychotherapy: Guideposts to the core of practice. New York: Routledge.
- Schneider, K.J. (2009). Awakening to Awe: Personal stories of profound transformation. Lanham, MD: Jason Aronson.
- Schneider, K.J., & Krug, O.T. (2010/2017). Existential-Humanistic Therapy. Washington, DC: American Psychological Association Press (Theories of Psychotherapy Series). A second edition was published in 2017.
- Schneider, K.J. (2013). "The polarized mind: Why it's killing us and what we can do about it." Colorado Springs, CO: University Professors Press.
- Krug, O., & Schneider, K.J. " (2016). "Supervision essentials for existential-humanistic therapy. Washington, DC: American Psychological Association Press (Clinical Supervision Essentials series).
- Schneider, K.J. (2017/2019). "The spirituality of awe: Challenges to the robotic revolution." Cardiff, CA: Waterfront Digital Press. Revised edition 2019 by University Professors Press.
- Schneider, K.J. (2020). "The depolarizing of America: A guidebook for social healing." University Professors Press.

=== Magazine articles ===
- Price, M. (November 2011). Searching for Meaning. Monitor on Psychology. American Psychological Association.
- Schneider, K.J. (2003, July/August). Enchanted agnosticism. Tikkun Magazine, 39–41.
- Schneider, K.J. (September 2005). Through the lens of awe. Spirituality and health.
- Schneider, K.J. (2005, September–November). Awe-based Learning. Institute for Noetic Sciences Shift Magazine.
- Schneider, K.J. (2008, January–February). Awe-based work. Tikkun Magazine, 20–21.
- Schneider, K.J. (2009, November–December). The awe-based challenge to positive psychology. Tikkun Magazine, 30–32, 73.
- Schneider, K.J. (September 2010). The case for existential therapy. Psychology Today. Online at http://www.psychologytoday.com/search/query?keys=kirk+schneider&x=0&y=0
- Schneider, K.J. (December 2010). Toward a humanistic positive psychology. Psychology Today. Online at http://www.psychologytoday.com/search/query?keys=kirk+schneider&x=0&y=0
- Schneider, K.J. (2011, Winter). 25th Anniversary Commentary. Tikkun Magazine, online at tikkun.org.
- Schneider, K.J. (2019). The U.S. needs a mental health czar. Scientific American
- Schneider, K.J. & Fatemi, S.M. (April 16, 2019). Today's biggest threat: The polarized mind.

=== Online and media resources ===
- Schneider, K.J. (2006). Existential Psychotherapy. American Psychological Association Video Series: Systems of Psychotherapy I. Washington, DC: American Psychological Association. (Available at www.apa.org/videos).
- May, R. (2007). (Speaker). Rollo May on existential psychotherapy. [DVD.] Psychotherapy.net (Available online at http://www.psychotherapy.net), San Francisco, CA. Interviewed by Kirk Schneider, John Galvin, and Ilene Serlin.
- Schneider, K.J. (December 2008). The Mystery of Being. TV Ontario Big Ideas Series. [Available at youtube.com]
- Schneider, K.J. (2009). Existential-Humanistic Therapy. . American Psychological Association Video Series: Psychotherapy Over Time [6 session format]. Washington, DC: American Psychological Association. (Available at www.apa.org/videos).
