= Raising Race Questions =

Racing Race Questions
- Author: Ali Michael
- Subject: Race and ethnicity in the United States
- Published: January 1, 2015
- Publisher: Teachers College Press
- Publication place: United States
- Pages: 192 pp

Raising Race Questions: Whiteness and Inquiry in Education: Raising Race Questions is a 2014 book about race and ethnicity in the United States by Ali Michael.

== Overview ==
Raising Race Questions explores challenges and opportunities that arise when White teachers deal with race and how it functions in their classrooms.
