= Barbara Love (disambiguation) =

Barbara Love (1937-2022) an American feminist writer, editor, and activist.

Barbara Love may also refer to:

- Barbara J. Love, activist with United to End Racism
- Barbara Jean Love, singer and member of The Friends of Distinction
