= Sean Lessard =

Canadian author and researcher

- Born: Montreal Lake, Saskatchewan, Canada
- Occupations: Associate Professor; author; public speaker

Academic background
- Education: University of Saskatchewan (ITEP); University of Alberta (BEd, MEd, PhD)
- Thesis: Red Worn Runners A Narrative Inquiry into the Stories of Aboriginal Youth and Families in Urban Settings (2014)
- Influences: D. Jean Clandinin; Vera Caine; Janice Huber

Academic work
- Discipline: Social Studies & Native Studies; Psychology; Philosophy
- Sub-discipline: Methodology
- Institutions: University of Alberta; University of Regina; Lakeland College (Alberta)
- Website: apps.ualberta.ca/directory/person/slessard

Sean Michael Lessard is a Cree-Canadian author, researcher, public speaker, a former adjunct professor at the University of Regina and currently an associate professor at the University of Alberta. Lessard previously worked for the Edmonton Public Schools as the Aboriginal Educational Consultant, and prior to that he worked for the Montreal Lake Cree Nation, Saskatchewan, as a youth worker, and as a "stay-in-school" coordinator for Nutana Collegiate in Saskatchewan.

Lessard's work primarily focuses on Indigenous culture, issues, and politics, most specifically as they affect Indigenous youth across Canada.

Lessard is on the board of directors of Spirit North, a non-profit organization that supports the advancement of academic outcomes for students and creates curriculum development opportunities for teachers.

Lessard is Woodland Cree from Montreal Lake Cree Nation.

== Education ==
Lessard attended the University of Alberta, where he received a Bachelor of Education in Social Studies/Native Studies in 2000, a Master of Education in Educational Psychology (Special Education) in 2010, and a Doctor of Philosophy in Elementary Education in 2013.

== Books ==
- Clandinin, D. Jean; Caine, Vera; Lessard, Sean; Huber, Janice (2016). Engaging in Narrative Inquiries with Children and Youth. Routledge. ISBN 978-1-62-958218-4.
- Clandinin, D. Jean; Caine, Vera; Lessard, Sean (2018). The Relational Ethics of Narrative Inquiry. Taylor & Francis. ISBN 978-1-35-197710-4.
- Caine, Vera; Clandinin, D. Jean; Lessard, Sean (2021). Narrative Inquiry: Philosophical Roots. Bloomsbury Publishing. ISBN 978-1-35-014206-0.
