= Humanistic psychology =

Psychological perspective

Humanistic psychology is a psychological perspective that arose in the early- to mid-20th century in response to Sigmund Freud's psychoanalytic theory and B. F. Skinner's behaviorism. The work of Otto Rank and Carl Rogers centered the individual more in therapy. Abraham Maslow built on their work establishing a "third force" in psychology in the 1950s.

Some elements of humanistic psychology are:

- to understand people, ourselves and others holistically (as wholes greater than the sums of their parts)
- to acknowledge the relevance and significance of the full life history of an individual
- to acknowledge the importance of intentionality in human existence
- to recognize the importance of an end goal of life for a healthy person

Humanistic psychology also acknowledges spiritual aspiration as an integral part of the psyche. It is linked to the emerging field of transpersonal psychology.

Primarily, humanistic therapy encourages a self-awareness and reflexivity that helps the client change their state of mind and behavior from one set of reactions to a healthier one with more productive and thoughtful actions. Essentially, this approach allows the merging of mindfulness and behavioral therapy, with positive social support.

In an article from the Association for Humanistic Psychology, the benefits of humanistic therapy are described as having a "crucial opportunity to lead our troubled culture back to its own healthy path. More than any other therapy, Humanistic-Existential therapy models democracy. It imposes ideologies of others upon the client less than other therapeutic practices. Freedom to choose is maximized. We validate our clients' human potential."

Its principal professional organizations in the US are the Association for Humanistic Psychology and the Society for Humanistic Psychology (Division 32 of the American Psychological Association). In Britain, there is the UK Association for Humanistic Psychology Practitioners.

== Differences with psychoanalytic theory and behaviorism ==
Through disagreement with the predominant theories at the time, developed by Freud and Skinner, Maslow was able to formulate the main points of humanistic theory.

Maslow had the following criticisms of the two main theories at the time:

1. Freud's theory was deterministic, meaning that it attributed the behavior of people to unconscious desires.
2. Freud and Skinner's theories focused on individuals with mental conflicts (pathological) rather than all individuals.
3. The other two theories did not focus enough on human potential for self-actualization.

As a result, when Maslow developed his theory, he decided to focus on the conscious (rather than the unconscious) and to develop a new theory to explain how all individuals could reach their highest potential, as expressed in his 1968 book Toward A Psychology of Being.

== Origins ==
One of humanistic psychology's early sources was the work of Carl Rogers. Rogers strongly influenced by Otto Rank, who had broken with Freud in the mid-1920s. Rogers' focus was to ensure that the developmental processes led to healthier, if not more creative, personality functioning. The term 'actualizing tendency' was also coined by Rogers, and was a concept that eventually led Maslow to study self-actualization as one of the needs of humans. Rogers and Maslow introduced this positive, humanistic psychology in response to what they viewed as the overly pessimistic view of psychoanalysis.

The other sources of inspiration include the philosophies of existentialism and phenomenology.

=== Conceptual origins ===
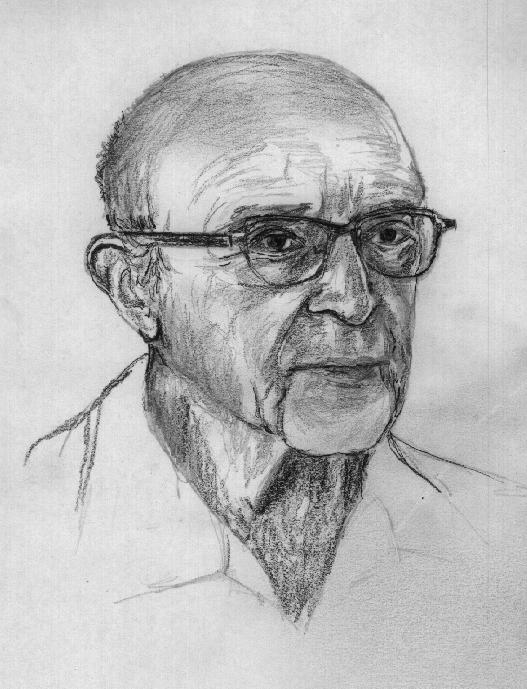
Carl Rogers (1902–1987), one of the founders of humanistic psychology.

While origins of humanistic psychology date back to the early 1940s, the origins of humanism date back to the classical civilizations of China, Greece, and Rome, whose values were renewed in the European Renaissance. The modern humanistic approach has its roots in the works of philosophers such as Kierkegaard, Nietzsche, Heidegger, Merleau-Ponty and Sartre. Eastern philosophy and psychology also play a central role in humanistic psychology, as well as Judeo-Christian philosophies of personalism, as each shares similar concerns about the nature of human existence and consciousness. For further information on influential figures in personalism, see: Nikolai Alexandrovich Berdyaev, Emmanuel Mounier, Gabriel Marcel, Denis de Rougemont, Jacques Maritain, Martin Buber, Emmanuel Levinas, Max Scheler and Pope John Paul II.

The 'first force', as Maslow called it, was behaviorism which grew out of Ivan Pavlov's work with the conditioned reflex. Pavlov, John B. Watson, and B. F. Skinner laid the foundations for academic psychology in the United States. Maslow believed the first force systematically excluded the subjective data of consciousness and much information bearing on the complexity of the human personality and its development. Behavioral theory continued to develop concerning both simple and complex human behavior through theorists such as Arthur Staats, Steven Hayes, and other post-Skinnerian researchers. Clinical behavioral analysis continues to be widely employed in anxiety disorder treatments, mood disorders, and personality disorders.

The 'second force' arose out of Freudian psychoanalysis, which was composed of psychologists like Alfred Adler, Erik Erikson, Carl Jung, Erich Fromm, Karen Horney, Melanie Klein, Harry Stack Sullivan, and Freud himself. Maslow argued the need for a 'third force' (even though he did not use the term), saying that "it is as if Freud supplied us the sick half of psychology and we must now fill it out with the healthy half."

In the late 1930s, psychologists like Maslow, Rogers, and Clark Moustakas became interested in the uniquely human issues, such as the self, self-actualization, health, hope, love, creativity, nature, being, becoming, individuality, and meaning. They sought to found a professional association dedicated to a psychology focused on these features of human capital demanded by post-industrial society.

The humanistic psychology perspective is summarized by five core principles or postulates of humanistic psychology first articulated in an article written by James Bugental in 1964 and adapted by Tom Greening, psychologist and long-time editor of the Journal of Humanistic Psychology. The five basic principles of humanistic psychology are:

1. Human beings, as human, supersede the sum of their parts. They cannot be reduced to components.
2. Human beings have their existence in a uniquely human context, as well as in a cosmic ecology.
3. Human beings are aware and are aware of being aware—i.e., they are conscious. Human consciousness always includes an awareness of oneself in the context of other people.
4. Human beings have the ability to make choices and therefore have responsibility.
5. Human beings are intentional, aim at goals, are aware that they cause future events, and seek meaning, value, and creativity.

While humanistic psychology is a specific division within the American Psychological Association (Division 32), humanistic psychology is not so much a discipline within psychology as a perspective on the human condition that informs psychological research and practice.

=== Practical origins ===
WWII created practical pressures on military psychologists, they had more patients to see and care for than time or resources permitted. The origins of group therapy are here. Eric Berne's progression of books shows this transition out of what we might call pragmatic psychology of WWII into his later innovation, transactional analysis, one of the most influential forms of humanistic popular psychology of the later 1960s-1970. Even though transactional analysis was considered a unique methodology, it was challenged after Berne's death.

== Orientation to scientific research ==
Humanistic psychologists have argued mainstream scientific research is insufficient in the analysis of human consciousness and behavior. The objection posited is research methods are derived from and suited for the physical sciences and not especially appropriate for studying the complexities and nuances of human meaning-making.

However, humanistic psychology has involved scientific research of human behavior since its inception. For example:

- Abraham Maslow proposed many of his theories of human growth in the form of testable hypotheses, and he encouraged scientists to put them to the test.
- Shortly after the founding of the American Association of Humanistic Psychology, its president, psychologist Sidney Jourard, began his column by declaring that "research" is a priority. "Humanistic Psychology will be best served if it is undergirded with research that seeks to throw light on the qualities of man that are uniquely human" (emphasis added)
- In May 1966, the AAHP release a newsletter editorial that confirmed the humanistic psychologist's "allegiance to meaningfulness in the selection of problems for study and of research procedures, and an opposition to a primary emphasis on objectivity at the expense of significance." This underscored the importance of research to humanistic psychologists as well as their interest in special forms of human science investigation.
- Likewise, in 1980, the American Psychological Association's publication for humanistic psychology (Division 32 of APA) ran an article titled, What makes research humanistic? As Donald Polkinghorne notes, "Humanistic theory does not propose that human action is completely independent of the environment or the mechanical and organic orders of the body, but it does suggest that, within the limits of experienced meanings, persons as unities can choose to act in ways not determined by prior events...and this is the theory we seek to test through our research" (p. 3).

A human science view is not opposed to quantitative methods, but, following Edmund Husserl:

1. favors letting the methods be derived from the subject matter and not uncritically adopting the methods of natural science, and
2. advocates for methodological pluralism. Consequently, much of the subject matter of psychology lends itself to qualitative approaches (e.g. the lived experience of grief), and quantitative methods are mainly appropriate when something can be counted without leveling the phenomena (e.g. the length of time spent crying).

Research has remained part of the humanistic psychology agenda, though with more of a holistic than reductionistic focus. Specific humanistic research methods evolved in the decades following the formation of the humanistic psychology movement.

== Development of the field ==
=== Saybrook Conference ===
In November 1964 key figures in the movement gathered at Old Saybrook, Connecticut for the First Invitational Conference on Humanistic Psychology. The meeting was a co-operation between the Association for Humanistic Psychology (AHP), which sponsored the conference, the Hazen Foundation, which provided financing, and Wesleyan University, which hosted the meeting. In addition to the founding figures of humanistic psychology - Maslow, Rollo May, Bugental, and Rogers - the meeting attracted humanists such as Gordon Allport, George Kelly, Clark Moustakas, Gardner Murphy, Henry Murray, Robert W. White, Charlotte Bühler, Floyd Matson, Jacques Barzun, and René Dubos. Robert Knapp was chairman and Henry Murray gave the keynote address.

Among the intentions of the participants was to formulate a new vision for psychology that, in their view, took into consideration a more complete image of the person. According to Aanstoos, Serlin & Greening the participants took issue with the positivistic trend in mainstream psychology at the time. The conference has been described as a historic event that was important for the academic status of humanistic psychology and its future aspirations.

=== Major theorists ===
Several key theorists have been considered to have prepared the ground for humanistic psychology. These theorists include Otto Rank, Abraham Maslow, Carl Rogers and Rollo May. This section provides a short-handed summary of each individual's contributions for the theory.

Abraham Maslow: In regards to humanistic theory, Maslow developed a hierarchy of needs. This is a pyramid which basically states that individuals first must have their physiological needs met, then safety, then love, then self-esteem and lastly self-actualization. People who have met their self-actualization needs are self-aware, caring, wise and their interests are problem centered. He theorized that self-actualizing people are continuously striving, thinking broadly and focusing on broader problems. He also believed however, that only 1% of people actually achieved self-actualization.

Carl Rogers: Rogers built upon Maslow's theory and argued that the process of self-actualization is nurtured in a growth promoting climate. Two conditions are required in order for a climate to be a self-actualizing growth promoting climate: the individual must be able to be their genuine self, and as the individual expresses their true self, they must be accepted by others.

== Counseling and therapy ==
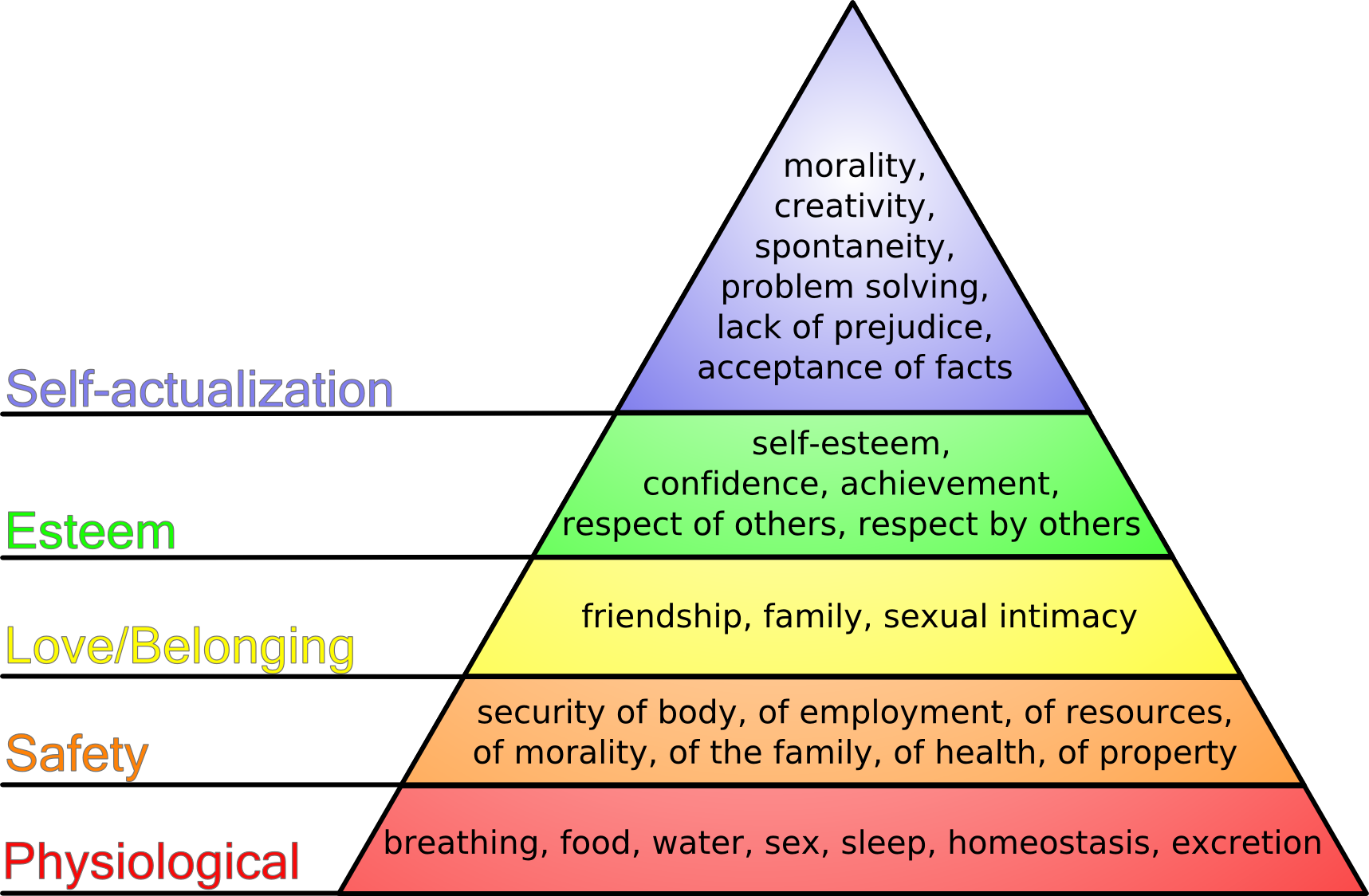
Diagram illustrating the "hierarchy of needs" theory of Abraham Maslow (1908–1970). Click to enlarge.

The aim of humanistic therapy is usually to help the client develop a stronger and healthier sense of self, also called self-actualization. Humanistic therapy attempts to teach clients that they have potential for self-fulfillment. This type of therapy is insight-based, meaning that the therapist attempts to provide the client with insights about their inner conflicts.

=== Approaches ===
Humanistic psychology includes several approaches to counseling and therapy. Among the earliest approaches we find the developmental theory of Abraham Maslow, emphasizing a hierarchy of needs and motivations; the existential psychology of Rollo May acknowledging human choice and the tragic aspects of human existence; and the person-centered or client-centered therapy of Carl Rogers, which is centered on the client's capacity for self-direction and understanding of his or her own development. Client-centered therapy is non-directive; the therapist listens to the client without judgement, allowing the client to come to insights by themselves. The therapist should ensure that all of the client's feelings are being considered and that the therapist has a firm grasp on the concerns of the client while ensuring that there is an air of acceptance and warmth. Client-centered therapist engages in active listening during therapy sessions.

Humanistic psychologists believed that while a therapist cannot be completely non-directive, a nonjudgmental, accepting environment that provides unconditional positive regard will encourage feelings of acceptance and value.

Existential psychotherapies, an application of humanistic psychology, applies existential philosophy, which emphasizes the idea that humans have the freedom to make sense of their lives. They are free to define themselves and do whatever it is they want to do. This is a type of humanistic therapy that forces the client to explore the meaning of their life, as well as its purpose. There is a conflict between having freedoms and having limitations. Examples of limitations include genetics, culture, and many other factors. Existential therapy involves trying to resolve this conflict.

Another approach to humanistic counseling and therapy is Gestalt therapy, which puts a focus on the here and now, especially as an opportunity to look past any preconceived notions and focus on how the present is affected by the past. Role-playing also plays a large role in Gestalt therapy and allows for a true expression of feelings that may not have been shared in other circumstances. In Gestalt therapy, non-verbal cues are an important indicator of how the client may actually be feeling, despite the feelings expressed.

Also part of the range of humanistic psychotherapy are concepts from depth therapy, holistic health, encounter groups, sensitivity training, marital and family therapies, body work, the existential psychotherapy of Medard Boss, and positive psychology.

=== Empathy and self-help ===
Empathy is one of the most important features of humanistic therapy. This idea focuses on the therapist's ability to see the world through the eyes of the client. Without this, therapists can be forced to apply an external frame of reference where the therapist is no longer understanding the actions and thoughts of the client as the client would, but strictly as a therapist which defeats the purpose of humanistic therapy. Included in empathizing, unconditional positive regard is one of the key elements of humanistic psychology. Unconditional positive regard refers to the care that the therapist needs to have for the client. This ensures that the therapist does not become the authority figure in the relationship allowing for a more open flow of information as well as a kinder relationship between the two. A therapist practicing humanistic therapy needs to show a willingness to listen and ensure the comfort of the patient where genuine feelings may be shared but are not forced upon someone. Marshall Rosenberg, one of Carl Rogers' students, emphasizes empathy in the relationship in his concept of Nonviolent Communication.

Self-help is also part of humanistic psychology: Sheila Ernst and Lucy Goodison have described using some of the main humanistic approaches in self-help groups. Humanistic psychology is applicable to self-help because it is oriented towards changing the way a person thinks. One can only improve once they decide to change their ways of thinking about themselves, once they decide to help themselves. Co-counselling, which is an approach based purely on self-help, is regarded as coming from humanistic psychology as well. Humanistic theory has had a strong influence on other forms of popular therapy, including Harvey Jackins' Re-evaluation Counselling and the work of Roger's student Eugene Gendlin; (see Focusing) as well as on the development of the humanistic psychodrama by Hans-Werner Gessmann since the 80s.

=== Ideal and real selves ===
The ideal self and real self involve understanding the issues that arise from having an idea of what you wish you were as a person, and having that not match with who you actually are as a person (incongruence). The ideal self is what a person believes should be done, as well as what their core values are. The real self is what is actually played out in life. Through humanistic therapy, an understanding of the present allows clients to add positive experiences to their real self-concept. The goal is to have the two concepts of self become congruent. Rogers believed that only when a therapist was able to be congruent can a real relationship occur in therapy. It is much easier to trust someone who is willing to share feelings openly, even if it may not be what the client always wants; this allows the therapist to foster a strong relationship.

=== Non-pathological ===
Because humanistic psychology seeks to be non-pathologizing and focused on the actual lived experience of individuals, a key ingredient is the actual meeting of therapist and client and the possibilities for dialogue to ensue between them. The role of the therapist is to create an environment where the client can freely express any thoughts or feelings, not suggest topics for conversation or guide the conversation in any way. The therapist also does not analyze or interpret the client's behavior or any information the client shares. The role of the therapist is to provide empathy and to listen attentively to the client.

== Societal applications ==
=== Social change ===
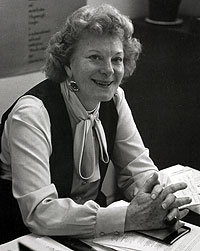
Virginia Satir

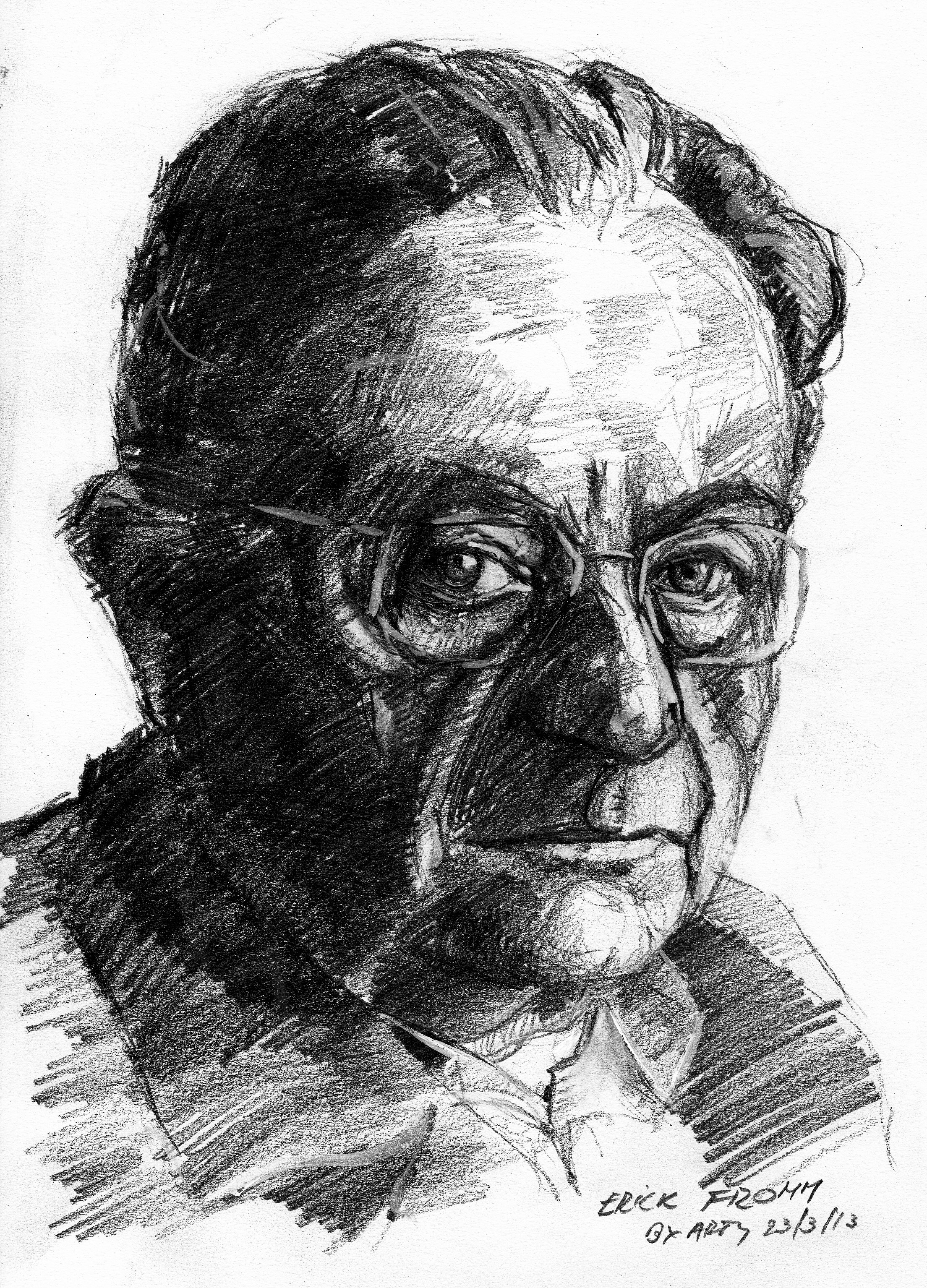
Erich Fromm

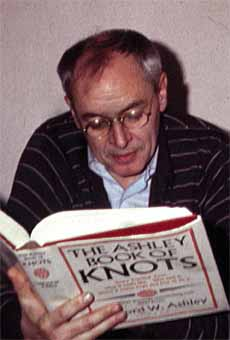
R. D. Laing

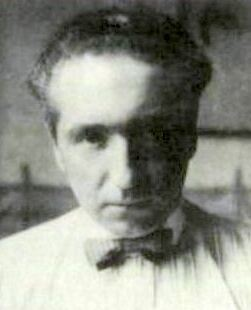
Wilhelm Reich

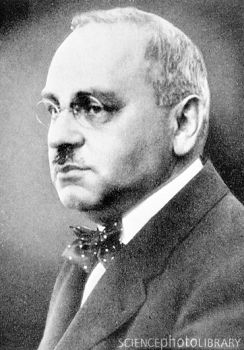
Alfred Adler

While personal transformation may be the primary focus of most humanistic psychologists, many also investigate pressing social, cultural, and gender issues. In an academic anthology from 2018, British psychologist Richard House and his co-editors wrote, "From its very outset, Humanistic Psychology has engaged fulsomely and fearlessly with the social, cultural and political, in a way that much of mainstream scientific, 'positivistic' psychology has sought to avoid". Some of the earliest writers who were associated with and inspired by psychological humanism explored socio-political topics. For example:

- Alfred Adler argued that achieving a sense of community feeling is essential to human development.
- Medard Boss defined health as an openness to the world, and unhealth as anything in the psyche or society that blocked or constricted that openness.
- Erich Fromm argued that the totalitarian impulse is rooted in people's fear of the uncertainties and responsibilities of freedom – and that the way to overcome that fear is to dare to live life fully and compassionately.
- R. D. Laing analyzed the political nature of "normal", everyday experience.
- Rollo May said that people have lost their values in the modern world, and that their health and humanity depends on having the courage to forge new values appropriate to the challenges of the present.
- Wilhelm Reich argued that psychological problems are often caused by sexual repression, and that the latter is influenced by social and political conditions – which can and should be changed.
- Carl Rogers came to believe that political life did not have to consist of an endless series of winner-take-all battles, that it could and should consist of an ongoing dialogue among all parties. If such dialogue were characterized by respect among the parties and authentic speaking by each party, compassionate understanding and – ultimately – mutually acceptable solutions could be reached.
- Virginia Satir believed that her approach to family therapy would enable individuals to expand their consciousness, become less fearful, and bring communities, cultures, and nations together.

Relevant work was not confined to these pioneer thinkers. In 1978, members of the Association for Humanistic Psychology embarked on a three-year effort to explore how the principles of humanistic psychology could be used to further the process of positive social and political change. The effort included a "12-Hour Political Party", held in San Francisco in 1980, where nearly 1,400 attendees discussed presentations by such non-traditional social thinkers as Ecotopia author Ernest Callenbach, Aquarian Conspiracy author Marilyn Ferguson, Person/Planet author Theodore Roszak, and New Age Politics author Mark Satin. The emergent perspective was summarized in a manifesto by AHP President George Leonard. It proffered such ideas as moving to a slow-growth or no-growth economy, decentralizing and "deprofessionalizing" society, and teaching social and emotional competencies in order to provide a foundation for more humane public policies and a healthier culture.

There have been many other attempts to articulate humanistic-psychology-oriented approaches to social change. For example, in 1979 psychologist Kenneth Lux and economist Mark A. Lutz called for a new economics based on humanistic psychology rather than utilitarianism. Also in 1979, California state legislator John Vasconcellos published a book calling for the integration of liberal politics and humanistic-psychological insight. From 1979 to 1983 the New World Alliance, a U.S. political organization based in Washington, D.C., attempted to inject humanistic-psychology ideas into political thinking and processes; sponsors of its newsletter included Vasconcellos and Carl Rogers.

In 1989, Maureen O'Hara, who had worked with both Rogers and Paulo Freire, pointed to a convergence between the two thinkers. According to O'Hara, both focus on developing critical consciousness of situations which oppress and dehumanize. Throughout the 1980s and 1990s, Institute of Noetic Sciences president Willis Harman argued that significant social change cannot occur without significant consciousness change. In the 21st century, influenced by humanistic psychology, people such as Edmund Bourne, Joanna Macy, Gabor Maté, and Marshall Rosenberg continued to apply psychological insights to social and political issues.

In addition to its uses in thinking about social change, humanistic psychology is considered to be the main theoretical and methodological source of humanistic social work.

=== Social work ===
After psychotherapy, social work is the most important beneficiary of the humanistic psychology's theory and methodology. These theories have produced a deep reform of the modern social work practice and theory, leading to the occurrence of a particular theory and methodology: humanistic social work. Most values and principles of the humanistic social work practice, described by Malcolm Payne in his book Humanistic Social Work: Core Principles in Practice, directly originate from the humanistic psychological theory and humanistic psychotherapy practice, namely creativity in human life and practice, developing self and spirituality, developing security and resilience, accountability, flexibility and complexity in human life and practice.

Furthermore, the representation and approach of the client (as human being) and social issue (as human issue) in social work is made from the humanistic psychology position. According to Petru Stefaroi, the way humanistic representation and approach of the client and their personality is realized is, in fact, the theoretical-axiological and methodological foundation of humanistic social work.

In setting goals and the intervention activities, in order to solve social/human problems, there prevail critical terms and categories of the humanistic psychology and psychotherapy, such as: self-actualization, human potential, holistic approach, human being, free will, subjectivity, human experience, self-determination/development, spirituality, creativity, positive thinking, client-centered and context-centered approach/intervention, empathy, personal growth, empowerment. Humanistic psychology has been utilised as a framework for theorizing the African philosophy of Ubuntu in social work practice. In addition, humanistic social work calls for the pursuit of social justice, holistic service provision, technological innovation and stewardship, dialogue and cooperation as well as professional care and peer support during the COVID-19 pandemic.

=== Foreign language learning, teaching and teacher education ===
Another field that has benefited from humanistic psychology is that of foreign language learning and language teacher education. Educators such as Earl Stevick and Gertrude Moskowitz applied student-centered methods in their language classes and teacher education courses, emphasizing interaction and participation, personal motivation, engagement and self evaluation. Their publications in turn have influenced generations of teachers interested in humanistic methods.

=== Creativity in corporations ===
Humanistic psychology's emphasis on creativity and wholeness created a foundation for new approaches towards human capital in the workplace stressing creativity and the relevance of emotional interactions. Previously the connotations of "creativity" were reserved for and primarily restricted to, working artists. In the 1980s, with increasing numbers of people working in the cognitive-cultural economy, creativity came to be seen as a useful commodity and competitive edge for international brands. This led to corporate creativity training in-service trainings for employees, led pre-eminently by Ned Herrmann at G.E. in the late 1970s.

== See also ==
- Buddhism and psychology
- California Institute of Integral Studies
- Esalen Institute
- Gestalt psychology
- Gestalt therapy
- Humanism
- Humanistic capitalism
- Humanistic economics
- Humanistic education
- Institute of Transpersonal Psychology
- Internal Family Systems Model
- Nonviolent Communication
- Organismic theory
- Personal development
- Positive psychology
- Primal integration
- Psychosynthesis
- Saybrook University
