= F. Michael Connelly =

Canadian academic

F. Michael Connelly (born 1936) is a Canadian academic known for his contributions to narrative inquiry. He is a professor emeritus at the University of Toronto's Ontario Institute for Studies in Education (OISE). He joined the university in 1968 and later served as the Director and Founder of the Centre for Teacher Development, as well as Chair of the Department of Curriculum. He founded and previously edited the academic journal Curriculum Inquiry. Connelly later directed the joint doctoral program with between OISE and the Hong Kong Institute of Education.

Connelly has received multiple awards and honours for his work, including the following:

- Canadian Society for the Study of Education's Outstanding Canadian Curriculum Scholar Award (1987)
- Canadian Education Association's Whitworth Award for Educational Research (1991)
- Ontario Confederation of University Faculty Associations' Outstanding Teaching Award (1995)
- American Educational Research Association's Lifetime Achievement Award in Curriculum Studies (1999)

Connelly has worked closely with D. Jean Clandinin, with whom he is credited for coining the term 'narrative inquiry'.

In Fall 2021, Connelly earned an honorary doctorate from the Education University of Hong Kong.

== Books ==
- Connelly, F. Michael, ed. (1977). Enquiry Teaching in Science: A Handbook for Secondary School Teachers. Toronto: Ontario Institute for Studies in Education. ISBN 978-0-7744-0131-9.
- Dukacz, Albert S.; Connelly, F. Michael; Quinlan, Frank (1980). Curriculum Planning for the Classroom. Ontario Institute for Studies in Education. ISBN 0-7744-0196-6.
- Connelly, F. Michael; Crocker, Robert Kirby; Kass, Heidi (1985). Science Education in Canada: Policies, practices & perceptions. Ontario Institute for Studies in Education. ISBN 978-0-7744-5072-0.
- Connelly, F. Michael; Clandinin, D. Jean (1988). Teachers as Curriculum Planners: Narratives of Experience. Teachers College Press. ISBN 978-0-80-772906-9.
- Clandinin, D. Jean; Connelly, F. Michael (1995). Teachers' Professional Knowledge Landscapes. Teachers College Press. ISBN 978-0-80-773419-3.
- Clandinin, D. Jean; Connelly, F. Michael (1999). Narrative Inquiry: Experience and Story in Qualitative Research. Jossey-Bass. ISBN 978-0-78-794343-1.
- Connelly, F. Michael; Clandinin, D. Jean (1999). Shaping a Professional Identity: Stories of Educational Practice. Teachers College Press. ISBN 978-0-80-773848-1.
- Phillion, JoAnn; He, Ming Fang; Connelly, F. Michael, eds. (2005). Narrative & experience in multicultural education. Thousand Oaks: Sage Publications. ISBN 978-1-4129-0582-4.
- Connelly, F. Michael; He, Ming Fang; Phillion, JoAnn, eds. (2008). The SAGE handbook of curriculum and instruction. Los Angeles: Sage Publications. ISBN 978-1-4129-0990-7. OCLC 137260063.
