= Association for Humanistic Psychology =

- Founder: Founded in 1963
- Type: Professional organization
- Purpose: Humanistic psychology
- Location: United States
- Method: Networking, conferences, publications
- Website: Association for Humanistic Psychology Official Website

The Association for Humanistic Psychology is a professional organization in the field of humanistic psychology, founded in 1963. Among the founders of the organization is the late psychologist Rollo May.

== History ==
In the years 1957 and 1958 a group of people met in Detroit in order to launch the field of Humanistic psychology and discuss the founding of a companion journal and association for Humanistic psychology. The group included Tom Greening, Abraham Maslow, Dorothy Lee, Ross Mooney, Marie Rasey, Carl Rogers, David Smillie and Frances Wilson.

The organization was originally founded as the American Association for Humanistic Psychology in 1961, sponsored by Brandeis University.

The official history of the association starts with the inaugural meeting, in Philadelphia, in 1963. Key players in this event was James Bugental, the first president of the association, and Gordon Allport, who arranged a grant to help with the founding.

In 1964 the association sponsored the "First Invitational Conference on Humanistic Psychology", also called the "Old Saybrook Conference", in order to develop the field of humanistic psychology. The conference was held in Connecticut and was visited by academic profiles in the field of humanistic psychology - Abraham Maslow, Carl Rogers and Rollo May - who presented papers. The men and women meeting at Old Saybrook in 1964 wanted to change the direction of psychology by introducing a more complete image of the human being than the image presented by Behaviorism or Freudianism. Their purpose was to restore the "whole person". They also wanted to develop research methods for this purpose. The association was the primary forum for the humanistic movement in the USA during the 1960s.

In 1969 the organization changed its name to the Association for Humanistic Psychology as a response to its growing international activities. Carmi Harari was appointed director of international development

In 1970 The New York Times reported from the eight annual meeting of the association, which was held in Miami Beach, Florida. The meeting was dedicated to the late Abraham Maslow, and vas visited by Rollo May, who gave a speech. By this time Floyd Matson had taken over as president of the association. That same year the association organized the first International Invitation Conference on Humanistic Psychology, in Amsterdam. At this time, Eleanor Criswell, who functioned as liaison officer for the organization, helped "create the concept of the Humanistic Psychology Institute", now Saybrook University. AHP oversaw the formation of the institute.

In 1971, Eleanor Criswell from the association launched the Humanistic Psychology Institute, later known as Saybrook Graduate School. Also this year, the association organized its second International Invitation Conference on Humanistic Psychology, at the University of Wurzburg. The third International Invitation Conference on Humanistic Psychology was arranged in cooperation with Sophia University, a Catholic institution, the following year.

1983 marked the start of The AHP Soviet Exchange Project, where delegates from the Association for Humanistic Psychology sought to establish contact with Soviet counterparts.

In 1985 the Chicago Tribune reported on the organizations annual conference, held at the American Congress Hotel in Chicago. This year the conference featured a variety of alternative therapies. By the early 1990s Maureen O'Hara had taken over as president of the association.

In 1991 the association expanded its United States/Soviet Professional Exchange Program, which was renamed the AHP International Professional Program; a forum for dialogue and exchange of Humanistic ideas. An outgrowth of this program was the Annual International Conference on Conflict Resolution, held in St. Petersburg, Russia.

== Publications ==
The Association publishes the Journal of Humanistic Psychology.

== See also ==
- Humanistic psychology
