= Co-counselling =

Method of personal change

Co-counselling (spelled co-counseling in American English) is a grassroots method of personal change based on reciprocal peer counselling. It uses simple methods. Time is shared equally and the essential requirement of the person taking their turn in the role of counsellor is to do their best to listen and give their full attention to the other person. It is not a discussion; the aim is to support the person in the client role to work through their own issues in a mainly self-directed way.

Co-counselling was originally formulated in the early 1950s by the American Harvey Jackins and originated in a schism in the Dianetics movement (itself in part derived from schisms in general semantics and cybernetics). Jackins founded the Re-evaluation Counseling (RC) Communities, with headquarters in Seattle, Washington, United States. His son, Tim Jackins, has been the international leader of Re-evaluation Counseling and its main affiliates until the summer of 2026. Like other offshoots of Dianetics such as Scientology and the Landmark Forum, Re-evaluation Counseling has features of a cult and an authoritarian leadership structure that actively suppresses dissent and critique.

There are a number of smaller, separate, independent organizations that have resulted from breakaways from, or re-workings of, Re-evaluation Counseling. The principal one of these is Co-Counseling International (CCI).

== Theoretical framework and assumptions ==
The original theory of co-counselling centres on the concept of distress patterns. These are patterns of behaviour, that is, behaviour that tends to be repeated in a particular type of circumstance, that are irrational, unhelpful or compulsive. The theory is that these patterns are driven by the accumulated consequences in the mind of (not currently) conscious memories of past events in which the person was unable to express or discharge the emotion appropriate to the event. Co-counselling enables release from the patterns by allowing "emotional discharge" of the past hurt experiences. Such cathartic discharge includes crying, warm perspiration, trembling, yawning, laughing and relaxed, non-repetitive talking. In day-to-day life, these "discharging" actions may be limited by social norms, such as, for example, taboos around crying, which are widespread in many cultures.

Having temporary, undivided, supportive attention from another person often gives rise to strong feelings towards that person; your counsellor often becomes your best friend for life. Sometimes people "fall in love" with each other. This is similar to the phenomenon of transference, particularly when one of the partners is felt to have more authority because, for instance, they are more experienced, are teachers of co-counselling, or have authority roles within the organisation. The organisations differ in the ways that they handle this. The inability to trust and feel in real relationships is sometimes exacerbated by the intimacy of co-counselling relationship, making transference a possibility. But participants are strongly encouraged and supported to counsel through these feelings, often leading to profound changes in their perspectives and abilities around closeness. For the most part, co-counselling relationships become life-long, therapeutic partnerships that enable the participant to have healthier relationships in general.

== Therapeutic context ==
Many co-counsellors take the view, often quite strongly, that co-counselling is not psychotherapy. In the beginning, this was because Re-evaluation Counseling decided not to draw on any discipline of psychotherapy for its theory and practice, although RC did incorporate some ideas from psycho-analysis such as "unconscious promptings" which Jackins adapted and relabeled "restimulation". A similar view is taken by some non-RC co-counsellors who regard psychotherapy as involving specialist techniques used by a therapist on a client and is therefore not peer and the client has little or no control over the process.

Others consider that co-counselling is psychotherapeutic, in that it enables change or therapy to take place in the psyche, soul affect or being of an individual. Co-counselling takes a positive view of the person (i.e. we are all essentially good), considers the mind and body as an integrated whole and acknowledges the value of catharsis; it is regarded as an approach within humanistic psychology, a view that would be rejected by some within RC.

== Co-Counselling International ==
Co-Counselling International (CCI) was started in 1974 as a breakaway from Re-evaluation Counseling by John Heron, who was at the time director of the Human Potential Research Project, University of Surrey UK, and Tom Sargent and Dency Sargent from Hartford, Connecticut, United States. Unlike other breakaways from RC, which involved changes of leadership but otherwise continued to practice in similar ways to RC, the CCI break was ideological, and CCI developed in significantly different ways.

== Relations between CCI and RC ==
The existence of other co-counselling organisations is generally not mentioned in RC, and RC co-counsellors are often not aware of their existence.

Amongst those within RC who know about it, CCI is often seen as an "attack organisation" and was specifically condemned as such in many private and public conversations by Jackins, who claimed that Heron had started it against a specific agreement not to, and in breach of RC guidelines he had previously agreed to. In turn, Heron and many of his supporters claimed that RC was authoritarian and cult-like, and later, that Jackins engaged in sexual abuse of clients. RC supporters parried that CCI fostered a sexually-liberal atmosphere that blurred the boundaries of co-counselling and relationships.

The history of co-counselling including its origins with RC is normally taught on CCI Fundamentals courses. CCI, by its nature, has no corporate opinion about RC, and individual CCI co-counsellors have their own views. Most CCI co-counsellors have a benevolent view toward RC, regarding it as a different, alternative approach to co-counselling. Membership of RC is not a bar to membership of CCI, and a few people manage to do both despite the RC ban.

== See also ==
- Tim Jackins
- Harvey Jackins
- John Heron
- List of counseling topics
- Critical friend
