= Catherine Kohler Riessman =

American academic (born 1939)

Catherine Kohler Riessman (born 1939) is an American academic known for her work in narrative inquiry, sociology, women’s studies, and social work. She is a research professor in Boston College's Department of Sociology and emerita professor at Boston University. According to Luttrell, Riessman's "imprint on the field of narrative studies is legendary", particularly regarding her "enduring commitment to and practice of researcher 'reflexivity'".

== Early life and education ==
Riessman grew up in Northern California and attended a Catholic school. Her family was Republican; her mother worked as an attorney and judge. After her parents' divorce, Riessman moved to New York, where she completed high school at a private school for girls. Following graduation, she attended Bard College, where she learned from Delmore Schwartz, Dwight Macdonald, and Ralph Ellison, among others. She later attended school for social work, then earned her Doctor of Philosophy in sociomedical science from Columbia University in 1977. At age 45, Riessman became a postdoctoral researcher at Harvard University.

== Career ==
In the 1960s, Riessman began her career as a social worker, where she supported a Community Mental Health Center in The Bronx, as well as an out-patient psychiatric clinic.

After obtaining her doctorate, Riessman researched pediatric health services, then taught at a social work school. In the 1980s, she taught medical sociology as she became more interested in qualitative research. Having completed literary analysis during her early degrees, she began thinking about how to apply literary analysis to the stories research participants share during an interview. After completing her post-doc, Riessman returned to teaching, including at universities in Europe and Australia. She retired as a professor emerita at Boston University. In spring 2005, she served as a visiting professor at the University of Bristol.

Riessman published her first book, Divorce Talk, in 1990. She later published three books focused on methodology: Narrative Analysis (1993), Qualitative Studies in Social Work Research (1994), and Narrative Methods for the Human Sciences (2008).

== Personal life ==
Riessman was married and has three children.

== Books ==
- Riessman, Catherine Kohler (1990). Divorce talk: women and men make sense of personal relationships. New Brunswick: Rutgers University Press. ISBN 978-0-8135-1502-1.
- Riessman, Catherine Kohler (1993). Narrative analysis. Qualitative research methods. Newbury Park, CA: Sage Publications. ISBN 978-0-8039-4753-5.
- Riessman, Catherine Kohler (1994). Qualitative studies in social work research. Thousand Oaks, CA: Sage Publications. ISBN 978-0-8039-5451-9.
- Riessman, Catherine Kohler (2008). Narrative methods for the human sciences. Los Angeles: Sage Publications. ISBN 978-0-7619-2997-0. OCLC 172521772.
