= Tim Jackins =

Tim (Timothy) Hugh Jackins (born c. 1945) is the International Reference Person (leader) of Re-evaluation Counseling (RC), known officially as the "International Re-evaluation Counseling Communities". Formerly a math teacher and union negotiator at the Mission College, Santa Clara, California, he succeeded his father Harvey Jackins in the role, following the former leader's death in 1999. Jackins is a graduate of Yale University and has a masters from Stanford.

== Role in RC ==
Jackins' leadership style within the RC movement has been perceived as different from his better-known father; he does not personally respond to correspondence from large numbers of people and attends fewer workshops and public speaking events. He is also much warmer, personally engaging, and "looser" during workshops than his father.

Jackins and Diane Shisk were reconfirmed as International Reference Person and Alternate International Reference Person by a unanimous vote of nearly 200 RC leaders at the RC World Conference in 2005. Leaders participating in the voting process were appointed by Jackins or his father. No alternative candidates were put forward.

In recent years, Jackins has made public statements on the 9/11 incident and US government responses to it and on the 2006 Lebanon War, which are displayed in the "IRP" area of the RC web site.

== Ideas about raising children ==
Jackins has published a number of books and writings on parental roles and raising children, including How Parents Can Counsel Their Children. The main thrust of these publications is that personal discharge of painful emotion by parents leads to a more relaxed style of parenting which enables young people to grow up themselves more free of painful emotional distress. Other major points are that parents deserve much more support than they typically receive in modern society and that children are at their cores intelligent, joyful humans who deserve to have their thinking respected.

== Personal life ==
The RC organization reports a need for privacy in connection with the personal lives of the IRP and deputy and publishes no biographical information about them, but it appears that having retired from his job recently. he is now more closely involved in the day-to-day running of RC, along with his deputy "Alternate International Reference Person" Diane Shisk, who manages the head offices of the organisation in Seattle, Washington.

Jackins is in his second marriage and is a parent with an adult son from a previous marriage. He now lives in Seattle.

== See also ==
- Co-counseling
- Anti-psychiatry
- United to End Racism
