= Jaber F. Gubrium =

American sociologist (born 1943)

Jaber Fandy Gubrium
- Born: 1943 (age 82–83); Gatineau, Canada
- Scientific career
- Fields: Sociology, Social Psychology, Narrative Ethnography, Gerontology
- Workplaces: Marquette University; University of Florida; University of Missouri

Jaber Fandy "Jay" Gubrium is an American sociologist and social psychologist. His research perspective is the narrative ethnography of caregiving, especially care constructed in an organizational context. He is a professor emeritus in the University of Missouri Department of Sociology.

== Career ==
Gubrium received his PhD in sociology specializing in social psychology from Wayne State University in 1970, with a dissertation titled Environmental Age-Concentration and Personal Resources: a Study of Their Impact on the Morale of the Aged. He then worked in the sociology department of Marquette University from 1970 until 1987, and after that as a professor of sociology at the University of Florida from 1987 until 2002. He chaired the University of Missouri Department of Sociology from 2002 to 2016, when he retired and was granted emeritus status.

Gubrium founded the Journal of Aging Studies for Elsevier in 1987, remaining its editor for 32 years. College of the Holy Cross professor Renee L. Beard took over the editor position from Gubrium in 2019.

== Research ==
Gubrium's areas of research are aging, health, care, everyday life, family discourse, human services ethnography, identity construction, social interaction, qualitative methods, and narrative analysis. He developed a constructionist approach to the life course and other social forms. He and collaborator James Holstein formulated an analytic vocabulary for studying identity as an institutional formation and family as a category of experience. The approach is methodically elaborated in relation to the complex practices of power in social interaction.

Gubrium contributed to the development of qualitative methods by conceptualizing their theoretical bearings. He has examined the everyday practices of narrativity, locating stories and storytelling within the circumstances of their production. The aim is to locate and describe social forms (identity, family, aging, health, policy, service and care) as practices of narrativity.

Gubrium is concerned with the everyday contours of meaning-making in diverse circumstances, from ordinary encounters to going concerns such as residential treatment for problem children and aging in nursing homes. He works at the border of ethnography and narrative analysis, combining these to deal with the perennial problems of linking observational data with stories, speech and other narrative material. The methodology has come to be called "narrative ethnography."

He executed a program of research on the social organization of care and treatment in human service institutions. His research on the everyday practice of caregiving in nursing homes, originally described in his monograph "Living and Dying at Murray Manor," presents the details of care from the perspectives of the residents, the staff and family members. He paid special attention to caregiving and the cognitively impaired, in particular how the Alzheimer's disease movement transformed the meaning of senility, as reported in his book Oldtimers and Alzheimer's: The Descriptive Organization of Senility. The program extended to institutional practices across the life course.

Ethnographies of institutional settings set the basis for comparison. Earlier research on interpretive practices in a residential treatment center for emotionally disturbed children was followed by ethnographic and narrative studies of accounting practices in physical rehabilitation, a psychiatric hospital, family counseling and self-help groups for home caregivers. The program centers on narrative events and strategic storytelling in everyday life, especially in an institutional context, with attention to implications for social policy.

Along with research colleagues David Buckholdt, James Holstein, and Amir Marvasti, Gubrium is credited with introducing the concept of "the active interview" to the social science community, as well as sensitizing concepts for researching storytelling and other accounts in everyday life, such as "analytic bracketing," "interpretive practice," "narrative ethnography," "narrative environments," "scenic presence," "assemblages of meaning, "narrative eventfulness," "biographical work," "deprivatization," "institutional identity," "local enactment," “site-specificity,” and "organizational embeddedness". Put together, the concepts provide a working configuration of ideas and categories—an analytics—for making visible and documenting the everyday organization of experience.

== Personal life ==
He is married to Suzanne Kish Gubrium, who is a retired medical software developer. They have two daughters, Aline Gubrium and Erika Gubrium, and five grandchildren. Aline Gubrium is a professor of public health at the University of Massachusetts, Amherst, and Erika Gubrium is a professor of social work and social policy at Oslo Metropolitan University in Norway.

== Awards and honors ==
Gubrium was a Fulbright Scholar at Tampere University in Finland (1996), Alfreda Kartha Distinguished Lecturer at the University of Toronto, Queen's University, and the University of Ottawa (1996), and Leiv Erikson Fellow at Oslo Metropolitan University in Norway (2012-13).

Gubrium received a Distinguished Scholar award from the American Sociological Association's Section on Aging and the Life Course in 1996.

He received a PhD honoris causa at Lund University, Sweden, on June 2, 2017.

Gubrium is a fellow of the Gerontological Society of America.

== Bibliography ==
=== Books ===
- Living and Dying at Murray Manor (Gubrium 1997/1975)
- "Time, Roles, and Self in Old Age" (Gubrium 1976)
- "Analyzing Field Reality" (Gubrium 1988)
- Out of Control: Family Therapy and Domestic Disorder" (Gubrium 1992)
- "Aging, Self, and Community" (Gubrium & Charmaz 1992)
- Speaking of Life (Gubrium 1993)
- Caretakers: Treating Emotionally Disturbed Children (Buckholdt & Gubrium 1979)
- Describing Care: Image and Practice Rehabilitation (Gubrium & Buckholdt 1982)
- Oldtimers and Alzheimer's: The Descriptive Organization of Senility (Gubrium 1986)
- What is Family? (Gubrium & Holstein 1990)
- "The Home Care Experience: Ethnography and Policy" (Gubrium & Sankar 1990)
- "The Mosaic of Care: Frail Elderly and their Families in the Real World" (Gubrium 1991)
- "The Active Interview" (Holstein & Gubrium 1995)
- The New Language of Qualitative Method (Gubrium & Holstein 1997)
- "Constructing the Life Course" (Gubrium & Buckholdt 2000)
- The Self We Live By: Narrative Identity in a Postmodern World (Holstein & Gubrium 2000)
- "Institutional Selves: Troubles Identities in a Postmodern World" (Gubrium & Holstein 2001)
- "Couples, Kids, and Family Life" (Gubrium & Holstein 2006)
- Analyzing Narrative Reality (Gubrium & Holstein 2009)
- "Varieties of Narrative Analysis" (Holstein & Gubrium 2012)
- Turning Troubles into Problems: Clientization in Human Services (Gubrium & Jarvinen 2014)
- Reimagining the Human Service Relationship (Gubrium, Andreassen & Solvang 2016)
- “Crafting Ethnographic Fieldwork: Sites, Selves, and Social Worlds” (Marvasti & Gubrium 2023)

Along with several collaborators, he has also published numerous related chapters and journal articles on the structure of everyday life, aging and the life course, the Alzheimer's disease movement, the physical rehabilitation process, children with ADHD, the social organization of care, human service practice, constructions of family, qualitative methodology, ethnographic fieldwork, and narrative analysis.
