= Journal of Aging Studies =

Quarterly peer-reviewed journal

- Subject: Aging
- Language: English
- Edited by: Renée Lynn Beard

Publication details
- History: 1987–present
- Publisher: Elsevier
- Frequency: Quarterly
- Impact factor: 1.347 (2018)

Standard abbreviations
- ISO 4: J. Aging Stud.

Indexing
- ISSN: 0890-4065 (print); 1879-193X (web)
- LCCN: 87640849
- OCLC no.: 890234278

Links
- Journal homepage; Online archive

The Journal of Aging Studies is a quarterly peer-reviewed scientific journal focused on the critical study of aging. Its innovative, disciplinary scope is broad, including the social sciences, behavioral sciences and the humanities. It was established in 1987 by Jaber F. Gubrium (University of Missouri), and is published by Elsevier. The editor-in-chief is Renée Lynn Beard (College of the Holy Cross). According to the Journal Citation Reports, the journal has a 2019 impact factor of 2.078.

The Journal of Aging Studies features scholarly articles offering theoretically engaged interpretations that challenge existing theory and empirical work. Articles need not deal with the field of aging as a whole, but with any defensibly relevant topic pertinent to the aging experience and related to the broad concerns and subject matter of the social and behavioral sciences and the humanities. The journal emphasizes innovation and critique - new directions in general - regardless of theoretical or methodological orientation or academic discipline (https://www.sciencedirect.com/journal/journal-of-aging-studies).
