= Harvey Jackins =

American counsellor

- Born: June 28, 1916; Idaho
- Died: July 12, 1999 (aged 83)
- Known for: Founder and principal theorist of Re-evaluation Counseling

Carl Harvey Jackins (June 28, 1916 – July 12, 1999) was the founder, leader and principal theorist of Re-evaluation Counseling (or RC).

== Early life ==
Jackins was born in Northern Idaho on June 28, 1916.

During the 1930s he was a member of the Communist Party of America. Between 1939 and 1941, he organized a Young Communist League at the University of Washington in Seattle. Never completing his undergraduate degree, he became a labor organizer in the 1940s. He was expelled from local 46 of the International Brotherhood of Electrical Workers, from the Building Service Employees' Union, and from Lodge 751 of the Aero Mechanics' Union for alleged Communist activities. In 1954 he was brought before the House Un-American Activities Committee as part of its investigation into Communist activities in Pacific Northwest after being named by three witnesses. He took the Fifth Amendment and refused to name former associates.

== Development of Re-evaluation Counseling ==
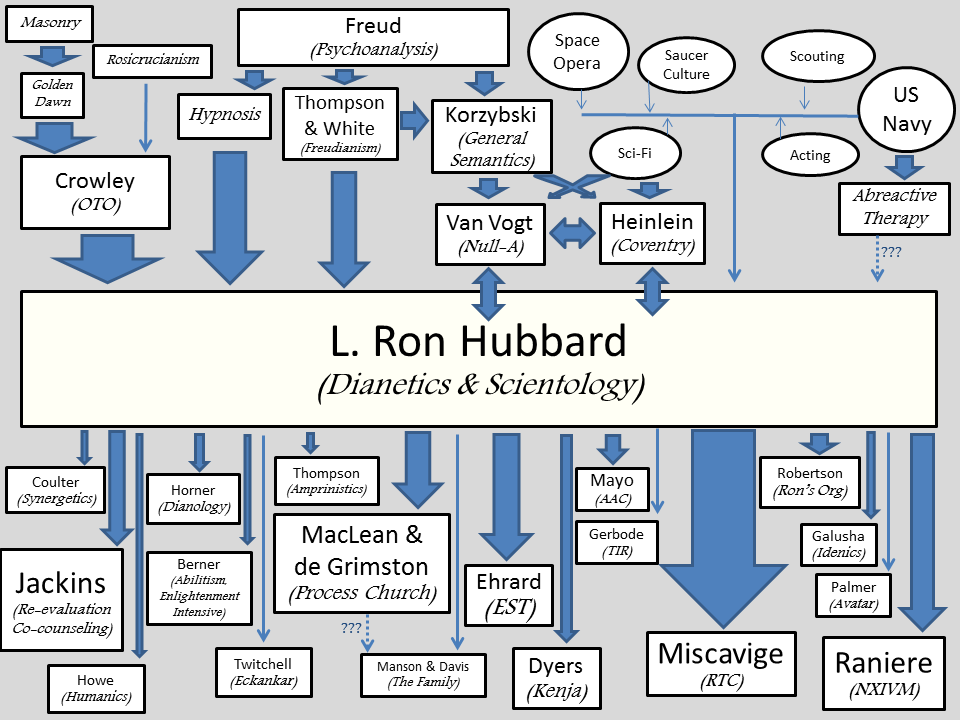
Hubbard's beliefs and practices, drawn from a diverse set of sources, influenced numerous offshoots, splinter-groups, and new movements.

In the early 1950s, Jackins became acquainted with L. Ron Hubbard's theory of Dianetics. In 1952 Jackins formed Personal Counselors Inc. to "engage in, conduct and teach the art and science of Dianetics." While practicing Dianetics, he developed the concepts of "re-evaluation" and "discharge" and came to believe that they could be encouraged by the "exchange of aware attention" in the "co-counseling process". At this time, Jackins used some of the terminology of Dianetics, such as "clearing up patterns", "rationality", "present time" and "passing distress by contagion". Psychiatrist Richard M. Childs claimed that Jackins' book The Human Side of Human Beings (1965) plagiarized Hubbard's Dianetics (1950), saying that Jackins "paraphrased Hubbard's terms by recasting them in his own jargon. Hubbard's 'Engrams' became Jackins' 'distress patterns', 'release' became 'discharge', and 'to become clear' became RC's 'to re-emerge'." In 1957, Hubbard's Scientology organisation claimed that Jackins was describing himself as a "Dianetics Auditor".

During the late 1950s and early 1960s, Jackins systematized his views and in the 1960s and 1970s took RC from Seattle, where he first practised it, to the rest of the US and to Europe. From 1975 to 1990, he appointed local teachers, area representatives, regional leaders and representatives of groups such as blacks and gays. He wrote RC's Guidelines and decided on all major issues. His policies were ratified by a biennial conference. Tourish and Irving compared his system of management to the Communist state model of democratic centralism. Jackins is said to have claimed that several governments were influenced by RC and to have thought that eventually religion will be replaced by Re-evaluation Counseling.

Harvey Jackins' own story of the origins of Re-evaluation Counseling leaves out any mention of Dianetics. As he told it, he began to develop Re-evaluation Co-Counseling after observing a troubled friend make changes in his thinking process through being patiently listened to while he cried. Curious about the effect of this crying, he worked with others to develop a method of reciprocal counseling based on the recollection of psychological and physical traumas or "hurts" accompanied by various types of emotional catharsis. He called these effects "discharge" (as in the discharge of a battery), which he came to believe led to clear thinking or "re-evaluation". He held that rational thinking was prevented by the accumulation of past hurts, which could be removed by repeated discharge through co-counseling. The objective of RC became the dissemination of this method of creating rational thinking, a process called "re-emergence". Re-evaluation counseling, it is held, can remove "oppression", which it considers to lie at the root of most of the problems in the world.

In the mid-1990s, Jackins was criticized within RC for his views that homosexuality may be a form of "distress" arising from the mistreatment of young children, and that it may be "recovered" or removed. In a 1974 article entitled "Is Homosexuality a Distress Pattern?", Jackins said that homosexuality, "as distinct from the desire to touch or be close, is irrational, is the result of distress patterns (often very early in origin and chronic), and will disappear by the free choice of the individual with sufficient discharge and re-evaluation."

=== Allegations of sexual misconduct ===
In the 1980s, RC members began to accuse Jackins of sexual misconduct, which was said to range from favoring attractive young women in the organization to rape. The first allegation of sexual abuse was made in 1981 by RC member Deborah Curren. Her claims were reported in the Seattle Sun and on a local TV station, KIRO TV. Following the allegations, Jackins was strongly criticized by the Minneapolis-St Paul RC group. Jackins disbanded the group and forty-five members of RC resigned in protest. Jackins wrote that "The use of these rumors to attack me and through me the Community has been a very nasty problem in the last few months, and there is some indication that some of the spook agencies of the government and their dirty tricks department have been involved in this." Curren took out a lawsuit against Jackins but withdrew it when Jackins filed for costs.

== Criticism ==
In 1989 a group of RC leaders, led by Daniel le Bon, resigned from RC, stating in their resignation letter that RC had no scientific basis. They said that Jackins made improbable claims, took a dogmatic stance and ignored evidence. They said that Jackins had extended the purpose of RC from discharge to "general liberation from all oppressions" because there was no discharge and Jackins knew it. Le Bon subsequently created his own organisation, "Présence à soi", which was similar to RC in some respects.

=== Response ===
Jackins said that suggestions were welcome within the organisation but advised followers to ignore criticisms of RC leaders, which he dismissed as "attacks". His advice became RC policy. RC defines "attacks" as "attempts to harm a person, usually a leader, or an organization, in the guise of disagreeing and discussing". RC says that "People playing this role should not be 'counseled' but should be asked to apologize and, if unresponsive, should be made to leave the group and their attacks ignored." "To counter attacks on RC and its leaders, RC members are instructed to interrupt the person, approach the accusation as the personal problem of the accuser, and vigorously come to the defense of the person or people being attacked." In 1981, when allegations of sexual misconduct began to emerge, the World Conference of the Re-evaluation Counseling Communities resolved unanimously to "reject and condemn, as completely contradictory to the spirit and practice of Re-evaluation Counseling, the vicious gossip and slanderous circulation of written attacks upon Harvey Jackins."

== Personal life ==
Jackins had two sons. With the agreement of the RC community, Tim Jackins took over the leadership of Re-evaluation Counseling after his father's death .

== Publications ==
- Fundamentals of Co-counseling Manual (1962)
- The Human Side of Human Beings (1965)
- The Benign Reality (1981)
- Counselor/Client Notebooks(1989)
- Start Over Every Morning (1989)
- A Better World (1992)
- An Unbounded Future (2009)

With other authors

- Rough Notes from Buck Creek I (1971)
- Quotes (1975)
- Rough Notes from Liberation I & II (1976)
- Harvey Jackins: A Memorial (2000)

== See also ==
- Scientology
- Re-evaluation Counseling
- Co-Counseling
- Tim Jackins
- United to End Racism
- Anti-psychiatry
