= Donald E. Polkinghorne =

American scholar and psychotherapist (1936–2018)

Donald Elmer Polkinghorne (November 8, 1936–January 17, 2018) was an American scholar and psychotherapist known for his contributions to narrative inquiry. He was an emeritus professor and Chair of Counseling Psychology at the USC Rossier School of Education, at the University of Southern California.

In 1975, Polkinghorne became the academic dean for The Saybrook Institute. He became the institute's president the following year and remained in the position for a decade.

Polkinghorne taught counseling at California State University, Fullerton for three years before transferring to the University of Southern California, where he taught until his retirement in 2005. Three years later, he began teaching in the media psychology program at Fielding Graduate University, holding a faculty position until his death in 2018.

== Books ==
- Polkinghorne, Donald (1983). Methodology for the Human Sciences: Systems of Inquiry. Albany: State University of New York Press. ISBN 978-0-87395-663-5.
- Polkinghorne, Donald E. (1988). Narrative Knowing and the Human Sciences. Albany: State University of New York Press. ISBN 978-0-88706-623-8.
- Polkinghorne, Donald (2004). Practice and the Human Sciences: The Case for a Judgment-Based Practice of Care. Albany: State University of New York Press. ISBN 978-0-7914-6199-0.
