= Narrative inquiry =

Discipline within qualitative research

Narrative inquiry or narrative analysis emerged as a discipline from within the broader field of qualitative research in the early 20th century, as evidence exists that this method was used in psychology and sociology. Narrative inquiry uses field texts, such as stories, autobiography, journals, field notes, letters, conversations, interviews, family stories, photos (and other artifacts), and life experience, as the units of analysis to research and understand the way people create meaning in their lives as narratives.

Narrative inquiry has been employed as a tool for analysis in the fields of cognitive science, organizational studies, knowledge theory, applied linguistics, sociology, occupational science and education studies, among others. Other approaches include the development of quantitative methods and tools based on the large volume captured by fragmented anecdotal material, and that which is self signified or indexed at the point of capture. Narrative inquiry challenges the philosophy behind quantitative/grounded data-gathering and questions the idea of "objective" data; however, it has been criticized for not being "theoretical enough." In disciplines like applied linguistics, scholarly work has pointed out that enough critical mass of studies exists in the discipline that uses this theory, and that a framework can be developed to guide its application.

== Background ==
Narrative inquiry is a form of qualitative research, that emerged in the field of management science and later also developed in the field of knowledge management, which shares the sphere of information management. Narrative case studies were used by Sigmund Freud in the field of psychology, and biographies were used in sociology in the early twentieth century. Thus narrative inquiry focuses on the organization of human knowledge more than merely the collection and processing of data. It also implies that knowledge itself is considered valuable and noteworthy even when known by only one person.

Knowledge management was coined as a discipline in the early 1980s as a method of identifying, representing, sharing, and communicating knowledge. Knowledge management and narrative inquiry share the idea of knowledge transfer, a theory which seeks to transfer unquantifiable elements of knowledge, including experience. Knowledge, if not communicated, becomes arguably useless, literally unused.

Philosopher Andy Clark speculates that the ways in which minds deal with narrative (second-hand information) and memory (first-hand perception) are cognitively indistinguishable. Narrative, then, becomes an effective and powerful method of transferring knowledge.

More recently, there has been a "narrative turn" in social science in response to the criticism against the paradigmatic methods of research. It has also been forecasted that soon narrative inquiry will emerge as an independent research method as opposed to being an extension of the qualitative method.

== Narrative ways of knowing ==
Narrative is a powerful tool in the transfer, or sharing, of knowledge, one that is bound to cognitive issues of memory, constructed memory, and perceived memory. Jerome Bruner discusses this issue in his 1990 book, Acts of Meaning, where he considers the narrative form as a non-neutral rhetorical account that aims at "illocutionary intentions", or the desire to communicate meaning. This technique might be called "narrative" or defined as a particular branch of storytelling within the narrative method. Bruner's approach places the narrative in time, to "assume an experience of time" rather than just making reference to historical time.

This narrative approach captures the emotion of the moment described, rendering the event active rather than passive, infused with the latent meaning being communicated by the teller. Two concepts are thus tied to narrative storytelling: memory and notions of time; both as time as found in the past and time as re-lived in the present.

A narrative method accepts the idea that knowledge can be held in stories that can be relayed, stored, and retrieved. There is also a view that a critical event can play an important role as creating the context of a narrative to be captured.

== Method ==
1. Develop a research question

- A qualitative study seeks to learn why or how, so the writer's research must be directed at determining the why and how of the research topic. Therefore, when crafting a research question for a qualitative study, the writer will need to ask a why or how question about the topic.

2. Select or produce raw data

- The raw data tend to be interview transcriptions, but can also be the result of field notes compiled during participant observation or from other forms of data collection that can be used to produce a narrative.

3. Organize data

- According to psychologist Donald Polkinghorne, the goal of organizing data is to refine the research question and separate irrelevant or redundant information from that which will be eventually analyzed, sometimes referred to as "narrative smoothing."
- Some approaches to organizing data are as follows:

(When choosing a method of organization, one should choose the approach best suited to the research question and the goal of the project. For instance, Gee's method of organization would be best if studying the role language plays in narrative construction whereas Labov's method would more ideal for examining a certain event and its effect on an individual's experiences.)

- Labov's: Thematic organization or Synchronic Organization.

This method is considered useful for understanding major events in the narrative and the effect those events have on the individual constructing the narrative. The approach utilizes an "evaluation model" that organizes the data into an abstract (What was this about?), an orientation (Who? What? When? Where?), a complication (Then what happened?), an evaluation (So what?), a result (What finally happened?), and a coda (the finished narrative). Said narrative elements may not occur in a constant order; multiple or reoccurring elements may exist within a single narrative.

- Polkinghorne's: Chronological Organization or Diachronic Organization

also related to the sociology of stories approach that focuses on the contexts in which narratives are constructed. This approach attends to the "embodied nature" of the person telling the narrative, the context from which the narrative is created, the relationships between the narrative teller and others within the narrative, historical continuity, and the chronological organization of events. A story with a clear beginning, middle, and end is constructed from the narrative data. Polkinghorne makes the distinction between narrative analysis and analysis of narratives. Narrative analysis utilizes "narrative reasoning" by shaping data in a narrative form and doing an in-depth analysis of each narrative on its own, whereas analysis of narratives utilizes paradigmatic reasoning and analyzes themes across data that take the form of narratives.

- Bruner's functional approach focuses on what roles narratives serve for different individuals. In this approach, narratives are viewed as the way in which individuals construct and make sense of reality as well as the ways in which meanings are created and shared. This is considered a functional approach to narrative analysis because the emphasis of the analysis is focused on the work that the narrative serves in helping individuals make sense of their lives, particularly through shaping random and chaotic events into a coherent narrative that makes the events easier to handle by giving them meaning. The focus of this form of analysis is on the interpretations of events related in the narratives by the individual telling the story.

- Gee's approach of structural analysis focuses on the ways in which the narrative is conveyed by the speaker with particular emphasis given to the interaction between the speaker and the listener. In this form of analysis, the language that the speaker uses is the focus. This includes the language, the pauses in speech, discourse markers, and other similar structural aspects. In this approach, the narrative is divided into stanzas and each stanza is analyzed by itself and also in the way in which it connects to the other pieces of the narrative.

- Jaber F. Gubrium's form of narrative ethnography features the storytelling process as much as the story in analyzing narrativity. Moving from text to field, he and his associate James A. Holstein present an analytic vocabulary and procedural strategies for collecting and analyzing narrative material in everyday contexts, such as families and care settings. In their view, the structure and meaning of texts cannot be understood separate from the everyday contexts of their production. Their two books--"Analyzing Narrative Reality" and "Varieties of Narrative Analysis" provide dimensions of an institutionally-sensitive, constructionist approach to narrative production.

- There are a multitude of ways of organizing narrative data that fall under narrative analysis; different types of research questions lend themselves to different approaches. Regardless of the approach, qualitative researchers organize their data into groups based on various common traits.

4. Interpret data

- Some paradigms/theories that can be used to interpret data:

Paradigm or theory	Criteria	Form of theory	Type of narration
Positivist/postpositivist	Universalist, evidence-based, internal, external validity	Logical-deductive grounded	Scientific report
Constructivist	Trustworthiness, credibility, transferability, confirmability	Substantive	Interpretive case studies, ethnographic fiction
Feminist	Afrocentric, lived experience, dialogue, caring, accountability, race, class, gender, reflexivity, praxis, emotion, concrete grounding	Critical, standpoint	Essays, stories, experimental writing
Ethnic	Afrocentric, lived experience, dialogue, caring, accountability, race, class, gender	Standpoint, critical, historical	Essays, fables, dramas
Marxism	Emancipatory theory, falsifiability dialogical, race, class, gender	Critical, historical, economic	Historical, economic, sociocultural analyses
Cultural studies	Cultural practices, praxis, social texts, subjectivities	Social criticism	Cultural theory as criticism
Queer theory	Reflexivity, deconstruction	Social criticism, historical analysis	Theory as criticism, autobiography

- While interpreting qualitative data, researchers suggest looking for patterns, themes, and regularities as well as contrasts, paradoxes, and irregularities.

(The research question may have to change at this stage if the data does not offer insight to the inquiry.)

- The interpretation is seen in some approaches as co-created by not only the interviewer but also with help from the interviewee, as the researcher uses the interpretation given by the interviewee while also constructing their own meaning from the narrative.

With these approaches, the researcher should draw upon their own knowledge and the research to label the narrative.

- According to some qualitative researchers, the goal of data interpretation is to facilitate the interviewee's experience of the story through a narrative form.
- Narrative forms are produced by constructing a coherent story from the data and looking at the data from the perspective of one's research question.

== Interpretive research ==
The idea of imagination is where narrative inquiry and storytelling converge within narrative methodologies. Within narrative inquiry, storytelling seeks to better understand the "why" behind human action. Story collecting as a form of narrative inquiry allows the research participants to put the data into their own words and reveal the latent "why" behind their assertions.

"Interpretive research" is a form of field research methodology that also searches for the subjective "why". Interpretive research, using methods such as those termed ""storytelling" or "narrative inquiry", does not attempt to predefine independent variables and dependent variables, but acknowledges context and seeks to "understand phenomena through the meanings that people assign to them."

Two influential proponents of a narrative research model are Mark Johnson and Alasdair MacIntyre. In his work on experiential, embodied metaphors, Johnson encourages the researcher to challenge "how you see knowledge as embodied, embedded in a culture based on narrative unity," the "construct of continuity in individual lives."

The seven "functions of narrative work" as outlined by Catherine Kohler Riessman:

1. Narrative constitutes past experiences as it provides ways for individuals to make sense of the past.
2. Narrators argue with stories.
3. Persuading. Using rhetorical skill to position a statement to make it persuasive/to tell it how it "really" happened. To give it authenticity or 'truth'.
4. Engagement, keeping the audience in the dynamic relationship with the narrator.
5. Entertainment.
6. Stories can function to mislead an audience.
7. Stories can mobilize others into action for progressive change.

== Practices ==
Narrative analysis therefore can be used to acquire a deeper understanding of the ways in which a few individuals organize and derive meaning from events. It can be particularly useful for studying the impact of social structures on an individual and how that relates to identity, intimate relationships, and family. For example:

- Feminist scholars have found narrative analysis useful for data collection of perspectives that have been traditionally marginalized. The method is also appropriate to cross-cultural research. As Michael Brecher and Frank P. Harvey advocate, when asking unusual questions it is logical to ask them in an unusual manner.
- Developmental psychology utilizes narrative inquiry to depict a child's experiences in areas such as self-regulation, problem-solving and development of self.
- Personality uses the narrative approach in order to illustrate an individual's identity over a lifespan.
- Social movements have used narrative analysis in their persuasive techniques.
- Political practices. Stories are connected to the flow of power in the wider world. Some narratives serve different purposes for individuals and others, for groups. Some narratives overlap both individual experiences and social.
- Promulgation of a culture: Narratives and storytelling are used to remember past events, reveal morals, entertain, relate to one another, and engage a community. Narrative inquiry helps to create an identity and demonstrate/carry on cultural values/traditions. Stories connect humans to each other and to their culture. These cultural definitions aid to make social knowledge accessible to people who are unfamiliar with the culture/situation. An example of this is how children in a given society learn from their parents and the culture around them.

== Notable people ==
- Jerome Bruner
- D. Jean Clandinin
- F. Michael Connelly
- James Paul Gee
- Jaber F. Gubrium
- Mark Johnson
- William Labov
- Carl Leggo
- Alasdair MacIntyre
- Elliott Mishler
- Catherine Kohler Riessman
- Donald Polkinghorne

== See also ==
- Content analysis
- Frame analysis
- Hermeneutics
- Narrative psychology
- Narratology
- Organizational storytelling
- Praxis intervention
- Reflective practice
- Thematic analysis

== Bibliography ==
- David M. Boje, Narrative Methods for Organizational and Communication Research (Thousand Oaks, CA: Sage, 2001).
- Barbara Czarniawska-Joerges, Narratives in Social Science Research (Thousand Oaks, CA: Sage, 2004).
- D. Jean Clandinin and F. Michael Connelly, Narrative Inquiry: Experience and Story in Qualitative Research (San Francisco: Jossey-Bass Publishers, 2000).
- F. Michael Connelly and D. Jean Clandinin, "Stories of Experience and Narrative Inquiry." Educational Researcher 19, no. 5 (June–July 1990): 2–14.
- C. Conle, "Narrative Inquiry: Research Tool and Medium for Professional Development," European Journal of Teacher Education 23, no.1 (March 2000): 49–63.
- Jaber F. Gubrium & James A. Holstein. 2009. "Analyzing Narrative Reality." Thousand Oaks, CA: Sage.
- James A. Holstein & Jaber F. Gubrium (eds.). 2012. "Varieties of Narrative Analysis." Thousand Oaks, CA: Sage.
- Hones, Donald F. (1998). "Known in Part: The Transformational Power of Narrative Inquiry". Qualitative Inquiry. 4 (2): 225–248. doi:10.1177/107780049800400205. S2CID 145796495.
- Lucius-Hoene, G.; Deppermann, A. (2000). "Narrative Identity Empiricized: A Dialogical and Positioning Approach to Autobiographical Research". Narrative Inquiry. 10 (1): 199–222. doi:10.1075/ni.10.1.15luc.
- Nona Lyons and Vicki Kubler LaBoskey, Narrative Inquiry in Practice: Advancing the Knowledge of Teaching (New York: Teachers College Press, 2002).
- Lene Nielsen and Sabine Madsen, "Storytelling as Method for Sharing Knowledge across IT Projects," Proceedings of the 39th Hawaii International Conference on System Sciences, 2006
- Gary Oliver and Dave Snowden, "Patterns of Narrative in Organizational Knowledge Sharing," in Knowledge Management and Narratives: Organizational Effectiveness Through Storytelling, Georg Schreyögg and Joch Koch, eds. (Berlin: Erich Schmidt Verlag, 2005).
- Gian Pagnucci, Living the Narrative Life: Stories as a Tool for Meaning Making (Portsmouth, NH: Boynton/Cook, 2004).
- Donald Polkinghorne, Narrative Knowing and the Human Sciences (Albany: SUNY Press, 1988).
- Dave Snowden, "Complex Acts of Knowing: Paradox and Descriptive Self-Awareness," Journal of Knowledge Management 6, no. 2 (Spring 2002): 100–111.
- Dave Snowden, "Narrative Patterns: the perils and possibilities of using story in organisations," in Creating Value With Knowledge, Eric Lesser and Laurence Prusak, eds. (Oxford: Oxford University Press, 2004).
