= Vera Caine =

Canadian academic

Vera Franziska Julianne Caine

Academic background
- Education: University of Alberta
- Thesis: Dwelling with/in stories : ongoing conversations about narrative inquiry, including visual narrative inquiry, imagination, and relational ethics (2008)

Vera Caine is a Canadian academic at the University of Victoria. She is known for her work using narrative inquiry, community-based research, and participatory action research.

== Education ==
Caine grew up in Germany, and moved to Canada in 1991. She received her B.Sc.N. University of Alberta in 1998. She went on to receive an M.N. in 2002, and a Ph.D. in 2007, all from the University of Alberta. During her graduate studies, Caine used visual narrative inquiry to explore the experiences of Indigenous women living with HIV.

== Career ==
Caine worked at the University of Alberta for 14 years. From 2014 to 2019, Caine was a new investigator with the Canadian Institutes of Health Research. In 2022 Caine moved to the University of Victoria. Caine was the president of the Canadian Association of Nurses in HIV/AIDS Care for two years, from 2019 to 2021.

== Honors and awards ==
In 2015 Caine received the Alumni Horizon Award from the University of Alberta.

== Selected publications ==
- Huber, Janice; Caine, Vera; Huber, Marilyn; Steeves, Pam (2013). "Narrative Inquiry as Pedagogy in Education: The Extraordinary Potential of Living, Telling, Retelling, and Reliving Stories of Experience". Review of Research in Education. 37 (1): 212–242. doi:10.3102/0091732X12458885. ISSN 0091-732X.
- Clandin, D. Jean; Caine, Vera (2013). "Narrative Inquiry". In Trainor, Audrey A.; Graue, Elizabeth (eds.). Reviewing qualitative research in the social sciences. New York: Routledge. pp. 166–179. ISBN 978-0-203-81332-4.
- Clandinin, D. Jean; Caine, Vera; Lessard, Sean; Huber, Janice (2016). Engaging in Narrative Inquiries with Children and Youth. New York, NY: Routledge, Taylor & Francis Group. ISBN 978-1-62958-219-1.
- Caine, Vera; Estefan, Andrew; Clandinin, D. Jean (2019-09-20). Journeys in Narrative Inquiry: The Selected Works of D. Jean Clandinin (1 ed.). Routledge. doi:10.4324/9780429273896-16. ISBN 978-0-429-27389-6.
- Caine, Vera; Clandinin, D. Jean; Lessard, Sean (2021-12-16). Narrative Inquiry. London, England: Bloomsbury Publishing. ISBN 978-1-350-14207-7.
