= Dianetics =

Set of ideas and practices adopted by Scientologists

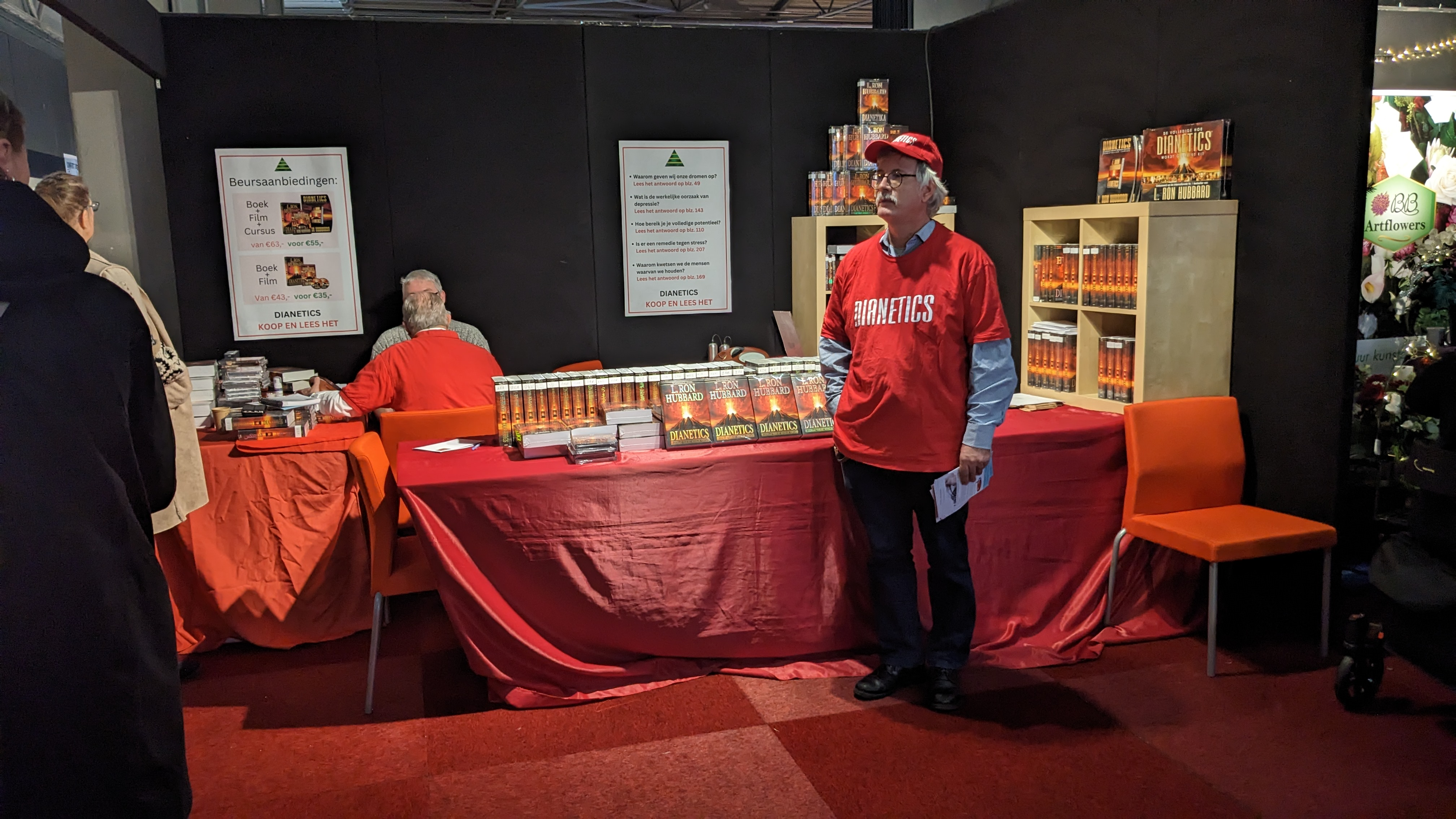
Netherlands, 2022

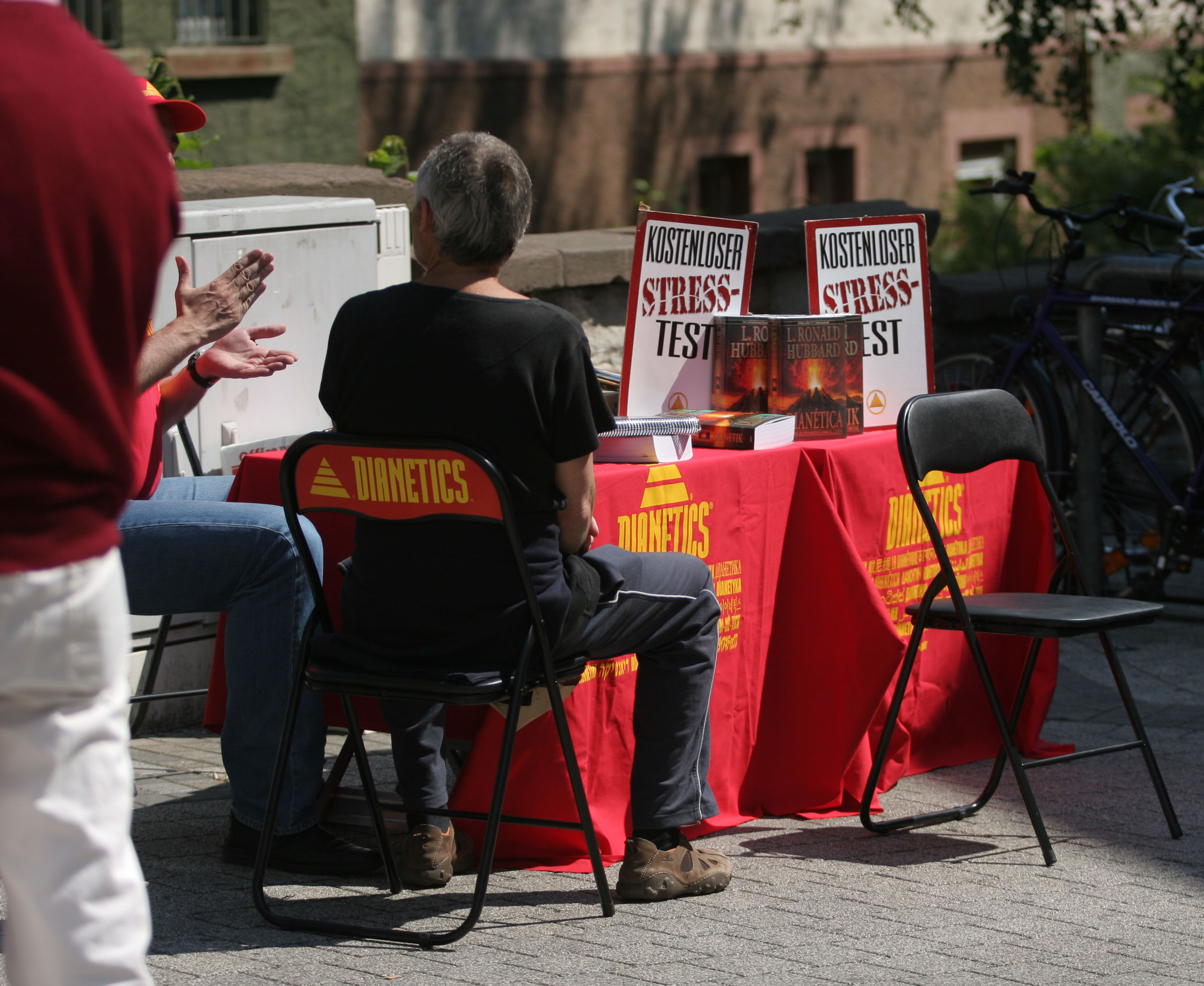
Germany, 2009

Dianetics is a set of pseudoscientific ideas and practices regarding the human mind invented in 1950 by science fiction writer L. Ron Hubbard. Dianetics was originally conceived as a form of psychological treatment, but was rejected by the psychological and medical establishments as pseudoscientific and ineffective. It was the precursor to Scientology and has since been incorporated into it. It involves a process called "auditing", which uses an electrical resistance meter, ostensibly to remove emotional burdens and "cure" people from their troubles.

"Auditing" uses techniques from hypnosis that are intended to create dependency and obedience in the auditing subject. Hubbard eventually decided to present Dianetics as a form of spirituality that is part of the Church of Scientology, after several practitioners were arrested for practicing medicine without a license and a prosecution trial was pending against the first Dianetics organization that Hubbard founded in Elizabeth, New Jersey. As well as escaping prosecution, Hubbard also saw the possibility of reducing the tax burden from the sale of Dianetics books and methods.

== Premise ==
The word Dianetics was coined from Greek dia meaning "through" and nous meaning "mind".

The pseudoscientific Dianetics ideas seek to explain the metaphysical relationship between the mind and the body. The theory describes the human mind as two parts: the conscious "analytical mind" and the subconscious "reactive mind". The stated purpose of the Dianetics technique of "auditing" is to erase the contents of the reactive mind—the holder of painful and destructive emotions that can act on a person as posthypnotic suggestions. "Auditing" uses techniques from hypnosis that are intended to create dependency and obedience in the auditing subject. In auditing, the person is asked questions intended to help them locate and deal with painful past experiences.

Dianetics theory posits that "the basic principle of existence is to survive" and that the basic personality of humans is sincere, intelligent, and good. The drive for goodness and survival is distorted and inhibited by aberrations (deviations from rational thinking). Hubbard claimed that Dianetics could increase intelligence, eliminate unwanted emotions, and alleviate a wide range of illnesses he believed to be psychosomatic. Conditions purportedly treatable by Dianetics included arthritis, allergies, asthma, some coronary difficulties, eye trouble, ulcers, migraines, and sexual deviance.

== History ==
According to Hubbard, he had a near-death experience while sedated for a dental operation in 1938 that inspired him to write the manuscript Excalibur. Though it was never published, the work allegedly became the basis for Dianetics. The first publication on Dianetics was Dianetics: The Evolution of a Science, an article by Hubbard in Astounding Science Fiction (cover date May 1950). This was followed by the book Dianetics: The Modern Science of Mental Health (DMSMH), published May 9, 1950. In these works Hubbard claimed that the source of all psychological pain, and therefore the cause of mental and physical health problems, was a form of memory known as "engrams". According to Hubbard, people could reach a state he named "Clear" when all their engrams had been removed by talking with an "auditor".

While the technique was not accepted by the medical and scientific establishment, in the first two years of its publication DMSMH sold over 100,000 copies. Publication of DMSMH brought in a flood of revenue, which Hubbard used to establish Dianetics foundations in six major U.S. cities. Two of the strongest initial supporters of Dianetics in the 1950s were John W. Campbell, editor of Astounding Science Fiction, and Joseph Augustus Winter, a writer and medical physician. Campbell published some of Hubbard's short stories, and Winter hoped that his own colleagues would likewise be attracted to Hubbard's Dianetics system.

Readers formed groups to study and practice Dianetics. According to sociologist Roy Wallis, this period was one of "excited experimentation" and Hubbard's work was regarded as "an initial exploration to be developed further by others". Per Wallis, it was Dianetics' popularity as a lay psychotherapy that contributed to the Dianetics Foundation's downfall. Most people read the book, tried it out, then put it down. The remaining practitioners had no ties to the Foundation. Factions formed and followers challenged Hubbard's movement and his authority. The craze of 1950–51 was dead by 1952.

In 1951, with debts piled up and facing bankruptcy, the Foundation was bailed out by Don Purcell, a wealthy Dianetics follower from Wichita. But the relief was short-lived, and the Foundation fell to bankruptcy in 1952. Hubbard fled to Phoenix, Arizona, having lost the Foundation, the rights to Dianetics, and the DMSMH copyrights to Purcell. Hubbard sued and in 1954 Purcell settled by giving the copyrights back to Hubbard.

In Phoenix, Hubbard created "Scientology"; its techniques were intended to rehabilitate people so that they might reach their full potential as spiritual beings. Dianetics was incorporated into Scientology. In 1978, Hubbard introduced "New Era Dianetics" (NED) and New Era Dianetics for OTs, and added them to The Bridge to Total Freedom.

== Concepts ==
In the book Dianetics: The Modern Science of Mental Health, Hubbard describes techniques that he suggests can rid people of fears and psychosomatic illnesses. A basic idea in Dianetics is that the mind consists of two parts: the "analytical mind" and the "reactive mind". The "reactive mind", which operates when a person is physically unconscious, acts as a record of shock, trauma, pain, and otherwise harmful memories. Experiences such as these are dubbed "engrams". Dianetics is proposed as a method to erase engrams in the reactive mind to achieve a state of clear.

In Dianetics, the unconscious or reactive mind is described as a collection of "mental image pictures", which contain the recorded experience of past moments of unconsciousness, including all sensory perceptions and feelings involved, ranging from prenatal experiences, infancy and childhood, to even the traumatic feelings associated with events from past lives and extraterrestrial cultures. The type of mental image picture created during a period of unconsciousness involves the exact recording of a painful experience. Hubbard called this phenomenon an engram, and defined it as "a moment of 'unconsciousness' containing physical pain or painful emotion and all perceptions and is not available to the analytical mind as experience".

Hubbard proposed that these engrams caused "aberrations" (deviations from rational thinking) in the mind, which produced lasting adverse physical and emotional effects. When the analytical (conscious) mind shut down during these moments, events and perceptions of this period were stored as engrams in the unconscious or reactive mind. In Hubbard's earliest publications on the subject, engrams were variously referred to as norn, impediment, and comanome before "engram" was adapted from its existing usage at the suggestion of Joseph Augustus Winter. Some commentators noted Dianetics's blend of science fiction and occult orientations at the time.

Hubbard claimed that engrams were the cause of almost all psychological and physical problems. In addition to physical pain, engrams could include words or phrases spoken in the vicinity while the patient was unconscious. For instance, Winter cites the example of a patient with a persistent headache supposedly tracing the problem to a doctor saying, "Take him now", during the patient's birth.

[The reactive mind] can give a man arthritis, bursitis, asthma, allergies, sinusitis, coronary trouble, high blood pressure ... And it is the only thing in the human being which can produce these effects ... Discharge the content of [the reactive mind] and the arthritis vanishes, myopia gets better, heart illness decreases, asthma disappears, stomachs function properly and the whole catalog of ills goes away and stays away.

— L. Ron Hubbard

According to Bent Corydon, Hubbard created the illusion that Dianetics was the first psychotherapy to address traumatic experiences in their own time, but others had done so before as standard procedure. Hugh Urban wrote it was clear that Hubbard's work had been influenced by Carl Jung, Sigmund Freud and Otto Rank, and Hubbard himself mentioned similarities between Dianetics and Freud.

Hubbard claimed that by using Dianetics technique the reactive mind could be emptied of all engrams; "cleared" of its contents. A person who has completed this process would be "Clear". The benefits of Clear might include a higher IQ, better relationships, or career success.

== Procedure ==
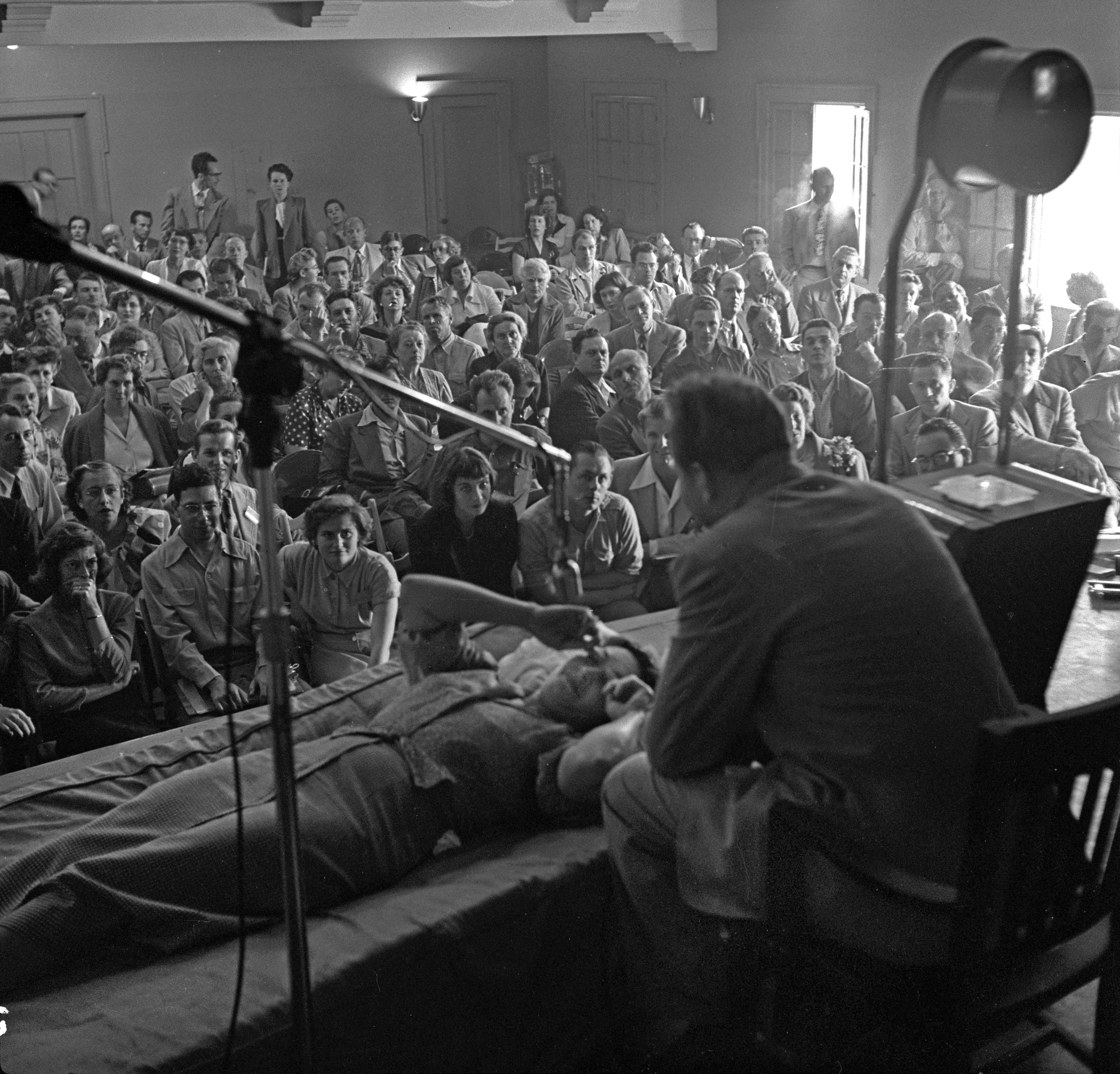
Hubbard demonstrating Dianetics technique at a seminar in Los Angeles, 1950

The procedure of Dianetics therapy (known as auditing) is a two-person activity. One person, the "auditor", guides the other person, the preclear, through the procedures. The preclear's job is to look at their mind and talk to the auditor. The auditor acknowledges what the preclear says and controls the process.

The auditor and preclear sit down facing each other. After getting settled, the auditor tells the preclear to close their eyes and locate something that happened to them in the past. The preclear tells the auditor what happened in the incident like they are re-experiencing it. The auditor coaxes the preclear to recall as much as possible, and goes back over the incident several times until the preclear is cheerful about it, at which point the auditor may end the session or find another incident and repeat the process.

== Therapeutic claims ==
The slick craftsman of mass-production science-fiction, mustering his talents and energies for a supreme effort, produces [...] a fictional science. Had dianetics been presented as fiction [...] it might have been, like other ingenious science-fiction, good entertainment.

— S. I. Hayakawa

In August 1950, amid the success of Dianetics, Hubbard held a demonstration at Los Angeles's Shrine Auditorium where he presented a young woman called Sonya Bianca (a pseudonym) to a large audience, including many reporters and photographers, as "the world's first Clear". Despite Hubbard's claim that she had "full and perfect recall of every moment of her life", Bianca proved unable to answer questions from the audience testing her memory and analytical abilities, including the question of the color of Hubbard's tie. Hubbard explained Bianca's failure to display her promised powers of recall to the audience by saying that he had used the word "now" in calling her to the stage, and thus inadvertently frozen her in "present time", which blocked her abilities. In the late 1950s, Hubbard claimed that several people had reached the state of Clear by the time he presented Bianca as the world's first; these others, Hubbard said, he had successfully cleared in the late 1940s while working incognito in Hollywood posing as a swami. In 1966, Hubbard declared South African Scientologist John McMaster to be the first true Clear.

Hubbard claimed, in an interview with The New York Times in November 1950, that "he had already submitted proof of claims made in the book to a number of scientists and associations." He added that the public as well as proper organizations were entitled to such proof and that he was ready and willing to give such proof in detail. In January 1951, the Hubbard Dianetic Research Foundation of Elizabeth, New Jersey, published Dianetic Processing: A Brief Survey of Research Projects and Preliminary Results, a booklet providing the results of psychometric tests conducted on 88 people undergoing Dianetics therapy. It presents case histories and a number of X-ray plates to support claims that Dianetics had cured "aberrations" including manic depression, asthma, arthritis, colitis and "overt homosexuality", and that after Dianetic processing, test subjects experienced significantly increased scores on a standardized IQ test. The report's subjects are not identified by name, but one of them is clearly Hubbard himself ("Case 1080A, R. L.").

The authors provide no qualifications, although they are described in Hubbard's book Science of Survival (where some results of the same study were reprinted) as psychotherapists. Critics of Dianetics are skeptical of this study, both because of the bias of the source and because the researchers appear to ascribe all physical benefits to Dianetics without considering possible outside factors; in other words, the report lacks any scientific controls. Winter was originally an associate of Hubbard and an early adopter of Dianetics, but by the end of 1950 had cut ties with Hubbard and written an account of his personal experiences with Dianetics. He called Hubbard "absolutistic and authoritarian", and criticized the Hubbard Dianetic Research Foundation for failing to undertake "precise scientific research into the functioning of the mind". He also recommended that auditing be done by experts only and that it was dangerous for laymen to audit each other. Hubbard writes: "Again, Dianetics is not being released to a profession, for no profession could encompass it."

== Scientific rejection ==
Hubbard's original book on Dianetics attracted highly critical reviews from science and medical writers and organizations. The American Psychological Association passed a resolution in 1950 calling "attention to the fact that these claims are not supported by empirical evidence of the sort required for the establishment of scientific generalizations." Dianetics has achieved no acceptance as a scientific theory, and scientists cite it as an example of a pseudoscience.

Few scientific investigations into the effectiveness of Dianetics have been published. Professor John A. Lee states in his 1970 evaluation of Dianetics:

Objective experimental verification of Hubbard's physiological and psychological doctrines is lacking. To date, no regular scientific agency has established the validity of his theories of prenatal perception and engrams, or cellular memory, or Dianetic reverie, or the effects of Scientology auditing routines. Existing knowledge contradicts Hubbard's theory of recording of perceptions during periods of unconsciousness.

— John A. Lee, The Lee Report (1970)

The MEDLINE database records two independent scientific studies on Dianetics, both conducted in the 1950s under the auspices of New York University. Harvey Jay Fischer tested Dianetic therapy against three claims made by proponents and found it does not affect any significant changes in intellectual functioning, mathematical ability, or the degree of personality conflicts; Jack Fox tested Hubbard's thesis regarding recall of engrams, with the assistance of the Dianetic Research Foundation, and could not substantiate it.

Commentators from a variety of backgrounds have described Dianetics as an example of pseudoscience. For example, philosophy professor Robert Carroll points to Dianetics' lack of empirical evidence:

What Hubbard touts as a science of mind lacks one key element that is expected of a science: empirical testing of claims. The key elements of Hubbard's so-called science don't seem testable, yet he repeatedly claims that he is asserting only scientific facts and data from many experiments. It isn't even clear what such "data" would look like. Most of his data is in the form of anecdotes and speculations ... Such speculation is appropriate in fiction, but not in science.

The validity and practice of auditing have been questioned by a variety of non-Scientologist commentators. Commenting on the example cited by Winter, the science writer Martin Gardner asserts that "nothing could be clearer from the above dialogue than the fact that the dianetic explanation for the headache existed only in the mind of the therapist, and that it was with considerable difficulty that the patient was maneuvered into accepting it."

Other critics and medical experts have suggested that Dianetic auditing is a form of hypnosis. Hubbard, who had previously used hypnosis for entertainment purposes, strongly denied this connection and cautioned against hypnosis in Dianetics auditing. Professor Richard J. Ofshe, a leading expert on false memories, suggests that the feeling of well-being reported by preclear at the end of an auditing session may be induced by post-hypnotic suggestion. Other researchers have identified quotations in Hubbard's work suggesting evidence that false memories were created in Dianetics, specifically in the form of birth and pre-birth memories.

According to an article by physician Martin Gumpert, "Hubbard's concept of psychosomatic disease is definitely wrong. Psychosomatic ailments are not simply caused by emotional disturbances: they are diseases in which the emotional and the organic factor are closely involved and interdependent."

But even the limited good that dianetics may do by introducing a single, narrowly-defined role-playing technique into interpersonal relations is probably more than offset by the damage it can do with its accompanying pretentious and nonsensical doctrines. [...T]hose who are helped by dianetics will necessarily be kept at a low level of intellectual and emotional maturity by the nonsense they have absorbed in order to be helped. The lure of the pseudoscientific vocabulary and promises of dianetics cannot but condemn thousands who are beginning to emerge from scientific illiteracy to a continuation of their susceptibility to word-magic and semantic hash.

— S. I. Hayakawa

== See also ==
- Bibliography of Scientology
- Co-counselling
