= James Bugental =

American psychologist (1915–2008)

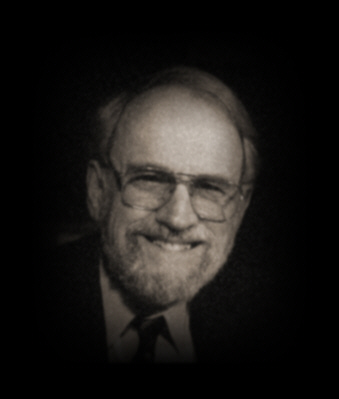
- Born: James Frederick Thomas Bugental; December 25, 1915
- Died: September 17, 2008 (aged 92)

Philosophical work
- Era: 20th century
- Region: Existential-Humanistic Psychology
- School: Existential-humanistic therapy
- Notable ideas: Postulates of humanistic psychology

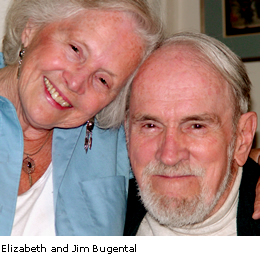
Bugental with wife Elizabeth

James Frederick Thomas Bugental (December 25, 1915 – September 17, 2008) was one of the predominant theorists and advocates of the Existential-humanistic therapy movement. He was a therapist, teacher and writer for over 50 years. He received his Ph.D. from Ohio State University, was named a Fellow of the American Psychological Association in 1955, and was the first recipient of the APA's Division of Humanistic Psychology's Rollo May Award. He held leadership positions in a number of professional organizations, including president of the California State Psychological Association.

== Theory ==
In "The Search for Authenticity" (1965), Bugental summarized the postulates of humanistic psychology, often quoted by other theorists:

- Human beings cannot be reduced to components.
- Human beings have in them a uniquely human context.
- Human consciousness includes an awareness of oneself in the context of other people.
- Human beings have choices and responsibilities.
- Human beings are intentional, they seek meaning, value and creativity.

== Publications ==
- "The Search for Authenticity" (1965)
- "The Search for Existential Identity" (1976)
- "Psychotherapy and Process" (1978)
- "Intimate Journeys: Stories from Life-Changing Therapy" (1990)
- "The Art of the Psychotherapist" (1992)
- "Psychotherapy Isn't What You Think" (1999)
