= Re-evaluation counseling =

Counseling business

Re-evaluation counseling (RC) is a business, and a network of peer counseling. Its core philosophy prescribes regularly relating painful memories to a peer counsel or group and releasing strong feelings by crying, shaking, or laughing as the best salve for psychological wounds. This idea was first developed in the 1950s by L. Ron Hubbard and called Dianetics (later Scientology).

Re-evaluation counseling recruits members by branding itself as a peer-based counseling procedure trying to help people and bring about social reform.

In the early 1970s Personal Counselors, Inc, established the Re-evaluation Counseling Community, made up of local groups of people called "Co-Counselors" in Seattle and beyond, based until 2021 in Seattle, Washington, and currently in Shoreline, Washington. It was led by Harvey Jackins until his death in 1999. It is currently led by his son Tim Jackins.

== History ==
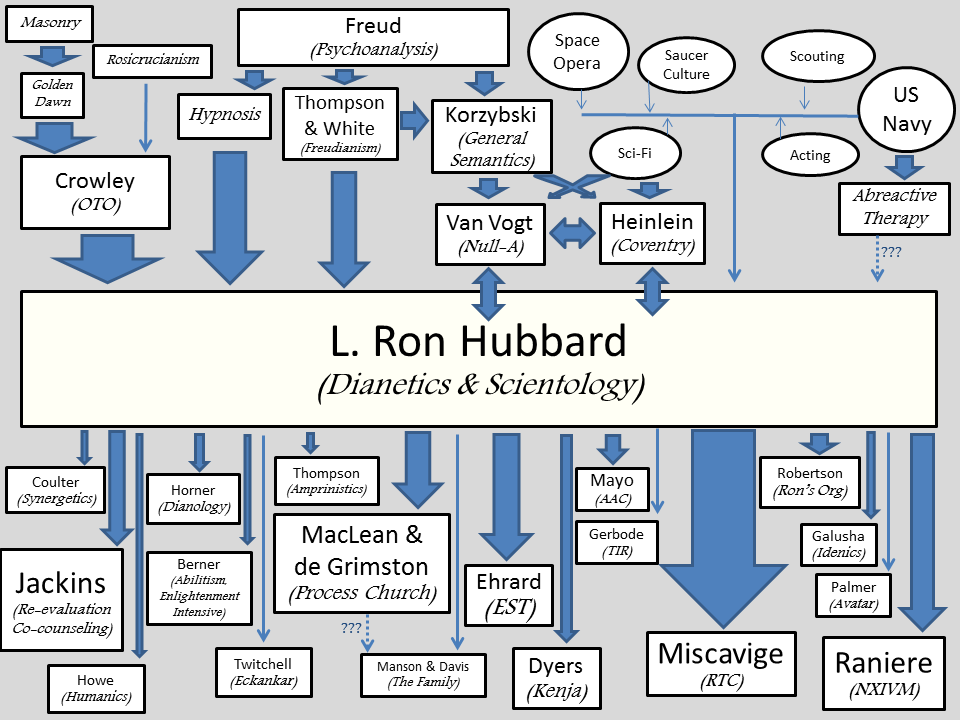
Hubbard's beliefs and practices, drawn from a diverse set of sources, influenced numerous offshoots, splinter-groups, and new movements.

In the early 1950s Harvey Jackins associated with L. Ron Hubbard (the founder of Scientology) and others interested in Dianetics (what later became Scientology). This led Jackins to establish Personal Counselors Inc. which aimed to "engage in, conduct and teach the art and science of Dianetics." RC reports that collaboration between Jackins and Hubbard became unworkable, and Jackins ended their association and continued to develop RC as a separate organization.

During the late 1950s and early 1960s, Jackins continued to build Personal Counselors, Inc., and in the 1960s and 1970s took RC from Seattle, where he first practiced it, to the rest of the US and then to other countries. Between 1975 and 1990, he appointed local teachers, area representatives, regional leaders and representatives of groups. A set of Guidelines for the community was adopted a biennial conference of local leaders. The Guidelines are revised at similar conferences, known as "World Conferences", originally biennial but currently every four years. The conferences also adopt general goals for the community.

After Jackins' death in 1999, his son, Tim Jackins, was chosen at a conference, attended by leaders in the RC communities worldwide, to take over the role of International Reference Person, the title given to the leader of RC.

== Investigation by the Boston Globe ==
Co-counseling was recently the focus of a 2021 investigation by The Boston Globe, after a youth worker in the school system was found to be practicing co-counseling (which is not a licensed therapy program) with minors without the permission of the student's parents.

Quoting from the Boston Globe: "Boston high school sophomore, Keondre McClay said he was pressured by the head of a district-sponsored youth advocacy program to attend an overnight retreat in Newton, where white adults asked the Black teenager to wrestle out his emotions on a gym mat with them. They said it would help him purge his trauma from experiencing racism. McClay fled to his room. Jenny Sazama, the program leader, and other retreat participants chased after him. For more than an hour, he recalled recently, they hugged him on his bed and entreated him to return to the group 'counseling' session while he hid under the covers screaming, “Please leave me alone!”.

== Organization ==
The organization's official title is "The International Re-evaluation Counseling Communities". It is resourced by Re-evaluation Counseling Community Resources, Inc., with headquarters in Shoreline, Washington, USA. Its president is Tim Jackins and its vice president is Sarah Elizabeth Jackins. The corporation owns trademark in the terms "Re-evaluation Counseling", "RC" and "United to End Racism". It also controls the Re-evaluation Foundation, a non-profit 501(c) organization, and Rational Island Publishers.

Within RC, Tim Jackins is called the "International Reference Person". He is a former community college mathematics teacher from Palo Alto, California, and a graduate of Yale and Stanford. He has been a co-counselor, leader and teacher of RC for most of his life. The International Reference Person appoints senior leaders ("reference persons") in consultation with local groups. Local groups choose local leaders. Reference persons are consulted about who can attend events, teach RC, and lead groups. According to RC itself, no reference person is paid.

Re-evaluation Counseling encourages its members to play an active role in public life and has set up groups to promote its ideas, which it calls "naturalized" groups. The main groups promoting RC methods are United to End Racism" (UER), formed in 2000, and Sustaining All Life, formed in 2015. UER is part of RC and shares its HQ in Shoreline.

The Re-evaluation Foundation aims "To provide opportunities for people to participate in Re-evaluation counseling who otherwise could not afford to participate." It was founded in 1972. Its president is Michael Markovits, a former vice-president of IBM. Its assets at the end of 2006 were approximately $1M. In 2007, the foundation made grants to several organizations initiated by Re-evaluation Counseling.

=== United to End Racism ===
United to End Racism
- Status: Active
- Genre: Anti-racism, ethnic
- Frequency: Annually
- Country: United States
- Inaugurated: 2000
- Website: www.unitedtoendracism.org

United to End Racism (UER) is a program made out of members of Re-evaluation Counseling (RC), which publicly states that its aim is to eliminate racism "on an individual basis" using Re-evaluation counseling, a practice invented by Harvey Jackins. UER was founded by RC on 28 November 2000.

United to End Racism is one of a number of non-profit organizations that represent RC in public forums. Harvey Jackins, founder of the RC movement, encouraged members of RC to create such organizations to spread RC ideas and objectives along lines decided by the RC leadership; previous well known examples of this tactic include Nuclear Freeze campaigns in the 1980s and the US-based National Coalition Building Institute, founded by RC'er Cherie Brown. Jackins' son, Tim Jackins, the current world leader of RC, is also the de facto leader of UER. The organisation appears solely to exist to service activist conferences as an invited body, and only sporadically carries out other activities. It has no separate membership from RC and is managed from Personal Counselors, Inc (recently renamed "Re-evaluation Counseling Community Resources, Inc"), the office of RC in Seattle. Officers of UER are members of Re-evaluation Counseling and UER policies are determined by the RC leadership.

== Aggressive response to criticism ==
There have been few papers about RC in scholarly journals. RC often refuses to cooperate with attempts at independent investigation. Dennis Tourish and Pauline Irving in a 1995 article compared his system of management to the communist state model of democratic centralism.

The organisation is sensitive to criticism, either external or internal, which it regards as an attack on the organization. According to Steve Carr, "To counter attacks on RC and its leaders, RC members are instructed to interrupt the person, approach the accusation as the personal problem of the accuser, and vigorously come to the defense of the person or people being attacked."

== See also ==
- Co-Counseling
- Harvey Jackins
- Tim Jackins
- List of psychotherapies
- List of counseling topics
- United to End Racism
