= Teachers College Press =

Academic press of Teachers College, Columbia University

- Parent company: Teachers College, Columbia University
- Status: Active
- Founded: 1904
- Founder: Teachers College, Columbia University
- Country of origin: United States
- Headquarters location: New York, New York
- Distribution: Books International (US); UTP Guidance Centre (Canada); Mare Nostrum Group (rest of world)
- Nonfiction topics: Education
- Official website: tcpress.com

Teachers College Press (also known as TC Press) is the university press of Teachers College, Columbia University. Founded in 1904, Teachers College Press has published professional and classroom materials for over a century and currently publishes 70 titles per year.

In addition to publishing materials for educators that "expand the dialogue between theory and practice," from infant/toddler to adult learning, Teachers College Press publishes the Environment Rating Scale® Family of Products. According to their website, the ERS are "research-based tools to assess the comprehensive quality of early childhood programs . . . The ERS are widely used in the U.S. and abroad to guide continuous quality improvement initiatives and to optimize the quality of early learning opportunities for young children." The first edition of the Early Childhood Environment Rating Scale® (ECERS), by Thelma Harms and Richard M. Clifford, was published in 1980.

== Notable Events ==
- 1889: The City of New York grants a provisional charter to found a college for the training of teachers.
- 1892: The New York College for the Training of Teachers changes its name to Teachers College and receives a permanent charter.
- 1898: Teachers College affiliates with Columbia University.
- 1904: The Bureau of Publications is established as the official professional publishing agency for Teachers College.
- 1965: The Bureau of Publications is renamed Teachers College Press.
- 1971: Teachers College Press is admitted into the American Association of University Presses.

== Directors ==
	Director	Tenure
1.	Hamden Forkner	1959–1966
2.	John Calan	1967–1970
3.	Robert P. Bletter	1971–1976
4.	Frank Jennings	1976–1977
5.	Thomas Rotell	1978–1983
6.	Carole Saltz	1983–2019
7.	Jennifer Feldman	2020–present

== See also ==
- List of English-language book publishing companies
- List of university presses
