= Harvard Department of Social Relations =

Interdisciplinary collaboration at Harvard University in the US

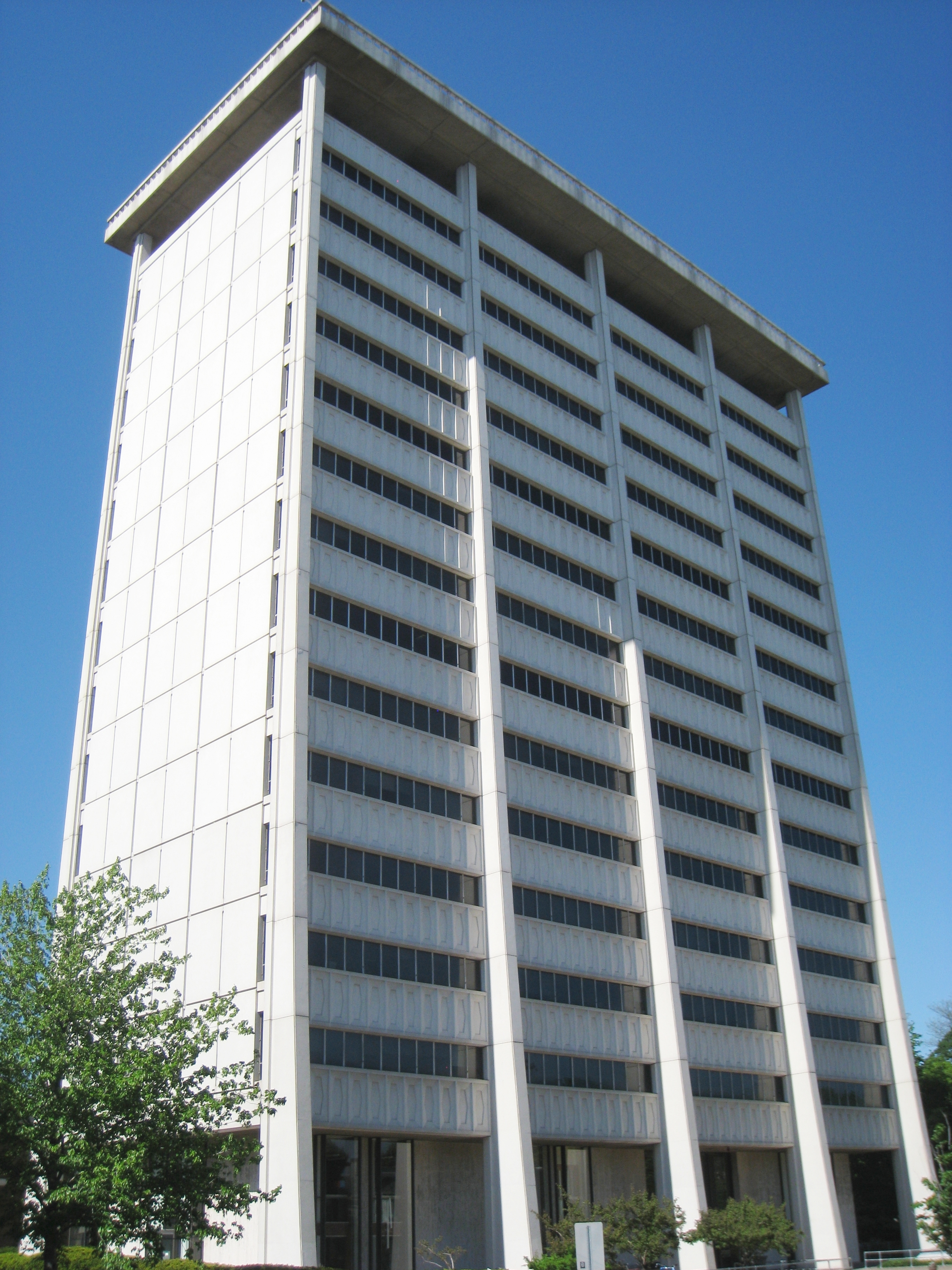
William James Hall, Harvard University, Cambridge, Massachusetts, USA.

The Department of Social Relations was an interdisciplinary collaboration among three of the social science departments at Harvard University (anthropology, psychology, and sociology) beginning in 1946. Originally, the program was headquartered in Emerson Hall at Harvard before moving to William James Hall in 1965. The founders had hoped to name it the Department of Human Relations, but the faculty objected, citing that rival Yale had an Institute of Human Relations. While the name "Social Relations" is often associated with the program's long-time chair and guiding spirit, sociologist Talcott Parsons, many major figures of mid-20th-century social science also numbered among the program's faculty, including psychologists Gordon Allport (personality and motivation), Jerome Bruner (cognitive psychology and narrative analysis), Roger Brown (social psychology and psycholinguistics), and Henry Murray (personality); anthropologists Clyde and Florence Kluckhohn (value orientations), David Riesman (sociology) John and Beatrice Whiting (cross-cultural child development), Evon Z. Vogt (comparative religion); and sociologist Alex Inkeles (Soviet studies and national character). Other prominent scholars, such as Jerome Kagan (developmental psychology) and Ezra Vogel (East Asia studies and sociology) belonged to the department early in their careers before it split. Many of the department's graduate students also went on to be major figures in US social sciences during the latter part of the twentieth century; their work tends towards strong interdisciplinary and cross-disciplinary approaches. Timothy Leary and Richard Alpert (later Ram Dass) were on the faculty, creating controversy with their experiments on students with psychedelic drugs (psilocybin) in the early 1960s.

Allport and Boring discussed the origins of the department's name in the April 1946 issue of the American Psychologist:

While [academic] departmental lines have remained rigid, there has been developing during the last decade, a synthesis of socio-cultural and psychological sciences which is widely recognized within the academic world in spite of the fact that there is no commonly accepted name to designate the synthesis. We propose that Harvard adopt, and thus help establish, the term Social Relations to characterize the emerging discipline which deals not only with the body of fact and theory traditionally recognized as the subject matter of sociology, but also with that portion of psychological science that treats the individual within the social system, and that portion of anthropological science that is particularly relevant to the social and cultural patterns of literate societies.

Social Relations sponsored or collaborated in a number of research studies characterized by explicit cross-cultural comparisons and multidisciplinary approaches to problems of policy or social theory. Major projects included the Six Cultures Study (headed by John and Beatrice Whiting, an anthropological study of child development in six different cultures, including a New England Baptist community; a Philippine barrio; an Okinawan village; an Indian village in Mexico; a northern Indian caste group; and a rural tribal group in Kenya); a multidisciplinary analysis of Soviet culture and society, published in part as How the Soviet System Works; and the Comparative Study of Values in Five Cultures during the 1950s, which examined five very different communities living in the same region of Texas: Zuni, Navajo, Mormon (LDS), Spanish-American (Mexican-American), and Texas Homesteaders.

The curriculum of the Harvard Social Relations had four inter-related components:

- Sociology;
- Social Psychology;
- Social Anthropology; and
- Personality Theory.

The program disaggregated into its component departments around 1972, though a certain interdisciplinarity remained throughout the 1970s. For a history of the department, see Harvard's Quixotic Pursuit of a New Science: The Rise and Fall of the Department of Social Relations, Patrick L. Schmidt (Rowman & Littlefield 2022).

A similar program at Yale, the Institute for Human Relations, also now disbanded, developed the Human Relations Area Files (HRAF), a cross-cultural database for comparative research, administered by Carol and Melvin Ember.

== Scholars associated with social relations at Harvard ==
- Gordon Allport, (1897–1967) psychologist
- Roger Brown, social psychologist
- Jerome Bruner, psychologist
- George Homans, sociologist
- Alex Inkeles, sociologist and scholar of national character
- Clyde Kluckhohn, (1905–1960) anthropologist
- Florence Rockwood Kluckhohn, anthropologist
- Seymour Martin Lipset, sociologist
- Eleanor Maccoby, developmental psychologist
- Barrington Moore, sociologist
- David McClelland, psychologist
- Henry A. Murray, psychologist
- Talcott Parsons, (1902–1979) sociologist
- David Riesman, sociologist
- Charles Tilly, (1929–2008), sociologist, historian, political scientist
- Evon Z. Vogt, anthropologist
- Harrison C. White, sociologist
- Robert W. White, (1904–2001) personality psychologist
- John Whiting (anthropologist), (1908–1999) anthropologist
- Beatrice Blyth Whiting, (1914–2003) anthropologist

== Notable graduates of social relations at Harvard ==
- Howard Gardner (social psychology/developmental psychology)
- Robert N. Bellah, sociologist, American civil society
- Bertram J. Cohler, (1938–2012) psychoanalyst and cultural psychologist
- Roy G. D'Andrade, cognitive anthropologist
- Carol R. Ember, cultural anthropologist
- Zelda Gamson, sociologist and educational reformer
- Harold Garfinkel, (1917–2011) sociologist
- Clifford Geertz, (1926–2006) cultural anthropologist
- Mark Granovetter, sociologist
- Janellen Huttenlocher, developmental and cognitive psychologist
- Edward E. Jones, social psychologist
- Nathan Kogan, social psychologist
- Leon Kamin, experimental psychologist
- Edward O. Laumann, sociologist and sexologist
- Robert A. LeVine, (1932-2023), psychological anthropologist
- Jean Lipman-Blumen, sociologist and leadership scholar
- Jean Mandler, cognitive psychologist
- Dan P. McAdams, social and personality psychologist
- Stanley Milgram, (1933–1984) social psychologist
- Susan Oyama, (1943–), philosopher of biology, developmental systems theorist and professor of psychology
- Richard Price (American anthropologist)
- Michelle Zimbalist Rosaldo, (1944–1981) feminist theorist and psychological anthropologist
- Renato Rosaldo, cultural anthropologist
- Barbara Rogoff, developmental and cultural psychologist
- Richard A. Shweder, psychological anthropologist and cultural psychologist
- Neil Smelser, sociologist
- Fred L. Strodtbeck, (1919–2005) social psychologist
- Abby Stewart, personality and feminist psychologist
- Marc J. Swartz, (1931–2011) cultural anthropologist
- Charles Tilly, (1929–2008), sociologist, historian, political scientist
- Michael Wallach, social psychologist
- Barry Wellman, (1942–2024), sociologist

== Interlocutors ==
- Irvin L. Child, (1915–2000) psychologist (Yale)
- Melvin Ember, (1933–2009) cultural anthropologist (Yale)
- Edward Shils, (1911–1995) sociologist (University of Chicago)

== Selected publications ==
- Bauer, Raymond A., Alex Inkeles, and Clyde Kluckhohn. 1956. How the Soviet System Works: cultural, psychological, and social themes. New York: Vintage.
- Homans, George Caspar. 1984. Coming to My Senses: The Autobiography of a Sociologist. Medford, MA: Routledge.
- Inkeles, Alex; with D.J. Levinson; Helen Beier; Eugenia Hanfman; Larry Diamond. 1997. National Character: a psycho-social perspective. New Brunswick, NJ: Transaction Publishers.
- Kluckhohn, Florence Rockwood and Fred L. Strodtbeck. 1961. Variations in value orientations. Evanston, IL: Row, Peterson.
- Munroe, Ruth H., Robert L. Munroe, Beatrice B. Whiting, eds. 1981. Handbook of cross-cultural human development. New York: Garland.
- Parsons, Talcott. 1949. The Structure of Social Action. Glencoe, IL: The Free Press.
- Parsons, Talcott and Edward Shils. 1951. Toward a General Theory of Action. Cambridge, Massachusetts: Harvard University Press.
- Vogt, Evon Zartman and Ethel M. Albert Vogt. 1966. People of Rimrock; a study of values in five cultures. Cambridge, Massachusetts: Harvard University Press.
- Whiting, Beatrice and John Whiting. 1975. Children of Six Cultures: a psychocultural analysis. Cambridge, Massachusetts: Harvard University Press.
