= Ann Kindrick Fischer =

American social anthropologist (1919–1971)

- Born: Anna Ruth Kindrick; May 22, 1919; Kansas City, Kansas
- Died: 1971 (aged 51–52)
- Education: Christian College; University of Kansas; Radcliffe College
- Occupation: Social anthropologist
- Spouse: John Lyle Fischer
- Children: 2

Ann Kindrick Fischer (1919–1971) was an American social anthropologist who became known for her study of the concept of the role of individuals in society and for her contributions to medical, psychological and applied anthropology. Archives of her papers are held at The Smithsonian Institutions.

== Biography ==
She was born Anna Ruth Kindrick on May 22, 1919, in Kansas City, Kansas, to Thomas W. Kindrick and Gertrude Anna Miller, who died when Anna was twelve. She had two younger sisters, Wanda Jean and Betty Lou. Anna was estranged from her father and described her mother's death as traumatic, making her a virtual orphan in an "embattled family." Her care was assumed by her mother's bookkeeper sister, Mary Miller, who was named her legal guardian.

Kindrick attended school in Kansas City and enrolled in Christian College in Columbia, Missouri, where she earned an Adjunct in Arts degree in 1938. She completed her Bachelor of Arts degree in sociology at the University of Kansas, Lawrence, Kansas, in 1941. She did graduate work in social anthropology at the University of Kansas and Radcliffe College (1946–1949) in Cambridge, Massachusetts. She earned her doctorate at Radcliffe and became proficient in reading French and German. It is said that she "never saw any real difference between the two fields" of sociology and anthropology.

=== Career ===
Ann Fischer conducted her first field work (1954–1957) at Truk Lagoon (now called Chuuk Lagoon) on Ponape (now called Pohnpei) in the Pacific islands of Micronesia. She is quoted as saying her decision to have children delayed her professional career by ten years.

After returning to the United States from Ponape with her husband and daughters, the family settled in Cambridge, Massachusetts. There, Fischer took on the role of a research assistant on the Six Cultures Project (1954–1957) sponsored by the Ford Foundation, which was a comparative study of socialization at Harvard University's Laboratory of Human Development.

In 1958, her husband accepted an appointment to the anthropology department at Tulane University in New Orleans. She accompanied him there and became the first anthropologist to be awarded a fellowship in biostatistics and epidemiology (1959). She went on to teach at both Tulane University and Newcomb College, both in New Orleans. She also continued to advocate for the indigenous Houma people of Louisiana.

=== Personal life ===
Ann was married twice. First, briefly, to James Meredith and then on July 9, 1949 to the anthropologist John Lyle Fischer. They had two children, Madeleine and Mary Ann.

== Selected publications ==
She published many articles in her own name and also with co-authors. She also remained unnamed (identified as "my wife") in at least one article published by her husband describing their joint project.

- Fischer, John L., Ann Fischer, and Frank Mahony. "Totemism and allergy." International Journal of Social Psychiatry 5, no. 1 (1959): 33-40.
- Fischer, Ann. "The importance of sibling position in the choice of a career in pediatric nursing." Journal of Health and Human Behavior 3, no. 4 (1962): 283-288.
- Fischer, Ann, "Flexibility in an Expressive Institution" Sumo. Southwestern Journal of Anthropology 22, (1966): 31-42.
- Fischer, Ann, and Peggy Golde. "The Position of Women in Anthropology 1." American Anthropologist 70, no. 2 (1968): 337-344.

== Legacy ==
The Smithsonian archives contain correspondence, field notes, manuscripts, microfilm, sound recordings and photographs by both Ann and John Fischer who often collaborated in their fieldwork. Most of the materials concern Ponape and Truk societies. The collection holds documents on Ponape from 1949 to the 1970s.

- Their work in Japan can also be found in the collection along with research they conducted for John and Beatrice Whiting's Six Cultures Project.
- The sound recordings relate mostly to Ponape, with additional recordings from Japan.
- Photographs are included from Micronesia, some of which were taken by Harry Clifford Fassett. There are also some photos from Japan and personal photographs.
- Psychological tests administered by John and Ann during their research in Ponape and Japan are included.
