= Phillip L. Hammack =

American academic

Phillip L. Hammack is an American academic in the field of psychology. As of 2025, Hammack is a professor at University of California, Santa Cruz, where he works with the Psychology Department, Stevenson College, and John R. Lewis College. He is also director of the university's Sexual and Gender Diversity Laboratory. His research explores "gender and sexual identity diversity and diversity in intimate relationships".

After completing his bachelor’s at Georgetown University in 1998, Hammack earned a Master of Arts in clinical psychology from Loyola University Chicago and a Doctor of Philosophy in cultural psychology from the University of Chicago.

Hammack served as president of the Society for Qualitative Inquiry in Psychology and as co-editor of the journal Psychology & Sexuality. He has received fellowships from the American Psychological Association and Center for Advanced Study in the Behavioral Sciences (2017–18). He has received the following awards and honors:

- Louise Kidder Early Career Award, American Psychological Association (2011)
- Erik Erikson Early Career Award, International Society of Political Psychology (2013)
- William T. Grant Foundation Scholar Award (2013–14)

== Contributions to the field ==
Throughout his career, Hammack has made several novel contributions to narrative psychology and the psychological study of gender and sexuality.

In his most cited work, “Narrative and the cultural psychology of identity” (2008), he utilizes the concept of “master narratives” alongside the developmental process of “narrative engagement” to investigate the relationship between personal narratives of identity and larger-scale, cultural, or group narratives. He draws together narrative theory, Vygotsky’s “cultural-historical activity theory,” and sociological perspectives on identity and social integration. The model he proposes integrates the “ideological content” of identity, as internalized over the course of development, with the idea of identity as a life story actively constructed by the individual through activity/practice.

Hammack’s book, Narrative and the politics of identity: The cultural psychology of Israeli and Palestinian youth (2011) synthesizes his research with Israeli and Palestinian youth during the Second Palestinian Intifada (uprising) who were actively engaged in peacebuilding intergroup dialogue. While conceptually anchored in psychology, the study used narrative and ethnographic methods and a longitudinal design to track adolescents engaged in peacebuilding dialogue over time. Although Hammack documents short-term changes in personal narratives of peace and conflict, the effects are mostly not sustainable over time. He attributes the unsustainability of ideological narrative change to a lack of change in the social structural and political reality of the conflict.

In Hammack’s most cited paper on sexuality, “The psychological world of the gay teenager: Social change, narrative, and ‘normality’” (2007), he and co-author and mentor Bertram J. Cohler highlight the contrasting narratives to which “gay” teens were exposed in the early twenty-first century. The authors discuss two primary narratives: a narrative of “struggle and success,” which assumes a redemptive form and follows the classic twentieth-century portrayals of “coming out” as necessary for a sexual minority person to achieve psychological health, and a narrative of “emancipation” from traditional sexual identity labels. In this paper, Hammack continues his intellectual commitment to the idea that human development is characterized by a process of “narrative engagement” in which the individual appropriates or repudiates discourses and narratives to which they are exposed. His paper (co-authored with David M. Frost and Sam D. Hughes), “Queer Intimacies: A New Paradigm for the Study of Relationship Diversity” (2019), offers a framework to consider relationships that deviate from various forms of normativity, including heterosexuality and monogamy.

Essentials of Narrative Analysis (2021) documents a unique person-centered method by Hammack and co-author Ruthellen Josselson. Their method maintains a focus on the whole person throughout analysis and the presentation of data rather than aggregating across persons to units such as themes or master narratives, as is common in other narrative psychology approaches. Hammack has also published in areas related to nonbinary gender, plurisexuality, ace spectrum identities, sexual subcultures and identities, polyamory and other consensual nonmonogamies, kink/BDSM, chosen families, and queer men’s health. Additionally, he is interested in issues of paradigm, theory, and method in social sciences and has a burgeoning interest in psychedelic medicine and its impacts on queer identity development.

== Bibliography ==
=== Books ===
- Hammack, P.L. Radical authenticity: The twenty-first century revolution in gender, sexuality, and relationships. Oxford University Press. (Contracted; expected date of publication: 2026)
- Josselson, R.; Hammack, P.L. (2021). Essentials of Narrative Analysis. Washington, DC: American Psychological Association. doi:10.1037/0000246-000. ISBN 9781433837388. OCLC 1230249900.
- Hammack, P.L., ed. (2018). The Oxford handbook of social psychology and social justice. New York: Oxford University Press. doi:10.1093/oxfordhb/9780199938735.001.0001. ISBN 9780190216818. OCLC 963239018.
- Hammack, P.L. (2011). Narrative and the Politics of Identity: The Cultural Psychology of Israeli and Palestinian Youth. New York: Oxford University Press. ISBN 9780195394467. OCLC 551198916.
- Hammack, P.L.; Cohler, B.J., eds. (2009). The story of sexual identity: Narrative perspectives on the gay and lesbian life course. Oxford: Oxford University Press. ISBN 9780195326789. OCLC 230802520.

=== Book chapters (select) ===
- Hammack, P.L.; Toolis, E.E. (2019). "The dialogic development of personality: Narrative, culture, and the study of lives". In McAdams, D.P.; Shiner, R.; Tackett, J.L. (eds.). Handbook of personality development. Guilford. pp. 465–486.
- Hammack, P.L. (2018). "Social psychology and social justice: Critical principles and perspectives for the twenty-first century". In Hammack, P.L. (ed.). The Oxford handbook of social psychology and social justice. Oxford University Press. pp. 3–39.
- Hammack, P.L.; Toolis, E.E. (2015). "Identity, politics, and the cultural psychology of adolescence". In Jensen, L. (ed.). The Oxford handbook of human development and culture. Oxford University Press. pp. 396–409.
- Hammack, P.L. (2015). "Theoretical foundations of identity". In McLean, K.C.; Syed, M. (eds.). The Oxford handbook of identity development. Oxford University Press. pp. 11–30.

=== Peer-reviewed journal articles (select) ===
- Hammack, P.L.; Josselson, R. (2025). "Person-centered narrative analysis: A methodological retrospective and primer". Qualitative Psychology. 12 (3): 416–434. doi:10.1037/qup0000341. ISSN 2326-3601.
- Hammack, P.L. (2025). "Sexual and gender diversity beyond minority identities: Do empirical trends call for a paradigm shift?". Review of General Psychology. 29 (3): 337–355. doi:10.1177/10892680251363847. ISSN 1089-2680.
- Hammack, P.L.; Manago, A. (2025). "The psychology of sexual and gender diversity in the twenty-first century: Social technologies and stories of authenticity". The American Psychologist. 80 (3): 375–388. doi:10.1037/amp0001366. ISSN 0003-066X. PMID 38780576.
- Hammack, P.L.; Wignall, L. (2024). "'Be dog have fun': Narratives of discovery, meaning, and motivation among members of the pup subculture". Sexuality & Culture. 28 (6): 2537–2556. doi:10.1007/s12119-024-10242-y. ISSN 1095-5143.
- Hammack, P.L.; Pletta, D.P.; Hughes, S.D.; Atwood, J.M.; Cohen, E.M.; Clark, R.C. (2024). "Community support for sexual and gender diversity, minority stress, and mental health: A mixed-methods study of adolescents with minoritized sexual and gender identities". Psychology of Sexual Orientation and Gender Diversity. 11 (2): 250–268. doi:10.1037/sgd0000591. ISSN 2329-0382.
- Hammack, P.L.; Wignall, L. (2023). "Sexual and gender diversity in the twenty-first century". Current Opinion in Psychology. 52 101616. doi:10.1016/j.copsyc.2023.101616. ISSN 2352-250X. PMID 37418831.
- Hammack, P.L.; Grecco, B.; Wilson, B.D.M.; Meyer, I.H. (2022). "'White, tall, top, masculine, muscular': Narratives of intracommunity stigma in young sexual minority men's experience on mobile apps". Archives of Sexual Behavior. 51 (5): 2413–2428. doi:10.1007/s10508-021-02144-z. ISSN 0004-0002. PMC 9293832. PMID 34820783.
- Hammack, P.L.; Hughes, S.D.; Atwood, J.M.; Cohen, E.M.; Clark, R. (2022). "Gender and sexual identity in adolescence: A mixed methods study of labeling in diverse community settings". Journal of Adolescent Research. 37 (2): 167–220. doi:10.1177/07435584211000315. ISSN 0743-5584.
- Hammack, P.L.; Toolis, E.E.; Wilson, B.D.M.; Clark, R.; Frost, D.M. (2019). "Making meaning of the impact pre-exposure prophylaxis (PrEP) on public health and sexual culture: Narratives of three generations of gay and bisexual men". Archives of Sexual Behavior. 48 (4): 1041–1058. doi:10.1007/s10508-019-1417-6. ISSN 0004-0002. PMC 7175836. PMID 30874978.
- Hammack, P.L.; Frost, D.M.; Hughes, S.D. (2019). "Queer Intimacies: A New Paradigm for the Study of Relationship Diversity". The Journal of Sex Research. 56 (4/5): 556–592. doi:10.1080/00224499.2018.1531281. ISSN 0022-4499. PMID 30362833.
- Hammack, P.L. (2018). "Gay men's identity development in the twenty-first century: Continuity and change, normalization and resistance". Human Development. 61 (2): 101–125. doi:10.1159/000486469. ISSN 0018-716X.
- Hammack, P.L.; Frost, D.M.; Meyer, I.H.; Pletta, D. (2018). "Gay men's health and identity: Social change and the life course". Archives of Sexual Behavior. 47 (1): 59–74. doi:10.1007/s10508-017-0990-9. ISSN 0004-0002. PMC 5903851. PMID 28585157.
- Hammack, P.L.; Toolis, E.E. (2015). "Putting the social into personal identity: The master narrative as root metaphor for psychological and developmental science". Human Development. 58 (6): 350–364. doi:10.1159/000446054. ISSN 0018-716X.
- Hammack, P.L.; Toolis, E.E. (2014). "Narrative and the social construction of adulthood". New Directions in Child and Adolescent Development. 2014 (145): 43–56. doi:10.1002/cad.20066. ISSN 1534-8687. PMID 25251509.
- Hammack, P.L.; Mayers, L.; Windell, E.P. (2013). "Narrative, psychology, and the politics of sexual identity in the United States: From "sickness" to "species" to "subject"". Psychology & Sexuality. 4 (3): 219–243. doi:10.1080/19419899.2011.621131. ISSN 1941-9899.
- Hammack, P.L.; Pilecki, A. (2012). "Narrative as a root metaphor for political psychology". Political Psychology. 33 (1): 75–103. doi:10.1111/j.1467-9221.2011.00859.x. ISSN 0162-895X.
- Hammack, P.L. (2011). "Narrative and the politics of meaning". Narrative Inquiry. 21 (2): 311–318. doi:10.1075/ni.21.2.09ham. ISSN 1387-6740.
- Hammack, P.L.; Cohler, B.J. (2011). "Narrative, identity, and the politics of exclusion: Social change and the gay and lesbian life course". Sexuality Research and Social Policy. 8 (3): 162–182. doi:10.1007/s13178-011-0060-3. ISSN 1868-9884.
- Hammack, P.L.; Thompson, E.M.; Pilecki, A. (2009). "Configurations of identity among sexual minority youth: Context, desire, and narrative". Journal of Youth and Adolescence. 38 (7): 867–883. doi:10.1007/s10964-008-9342-3. ISSN 0047-2891. PMID 19636732.
- Hammack, P.L. (2008). "Narrative and the cultural psychology of identity". Personality and Social Psychology Review. 12 (3): 222–247. doi:10.1177/1088868308316892. ISSN 1088-8683. PMID 18469303.
- Hammack, P.L. (2006). "Identity, conflict, and coexistence: Life stories of Israeli and Palestinian adolescents". Journal of Adolescent Research. 21 (4): 323–369. doi:10.1177/0743558406289745. ISSN 0743-5584.
- Hammack, P.L. (2005). "The life course development of human sexual orientation: An integrative paradigm". Human Development. 48 (5): 267–290. doi:10.1159/000086875. ISSN 0018-716X.
