= Bertram Cohler =

American psychologist (1938-2012)

Bertram Joseph Cohler
- Born: 3 December 1938; Chicago, Illinois, U.S.
- Died: 9 May 2012 (aged 73); Des Plaines, Illinois, U.S.
- Education: University of Chicago
- Scientific career
- Fields: Psychoanalyst, psychologist
- Workplaces: University of Chicago, Harvard University, Sonia Shankman Orthogenic School

Bertram Joseph Cohler (3 December 1938 – 9 May 2012) was an American psychologist, psychoanalyst, and educator primarily associated with the University of Chicago, the Chicago Institute for Psychoanalysis, and Harvard University. He advocated a life course approach to understanding human experience and subjectivity, drawing on insights from psychoanalysis, developmental psychology, personology, psychological anthropology, narrative studies, and the interdisciplinary field of human development. Cohler authored or co-authored over 200 articles and books. He contributed to numerous scholarly fields, including the study of adversity, resilience and coping; mental illness and treatment; family and social relations in normal development and mental illness; and the study of personal narrative in social and historical context. He made particular contributions to the study of sexual identity over the life course, to the psychoanalytic understanding of homosexuality., and to the study of personal narratives of Holocaust survivors. Other than his graduate study at Harvard, Cohler spent his career at the University of Chicago and affiliated institutions, where he was repeatedly recognized as an educator and a builder of bridges across disciplines. He was treated for esophageal cancer in 2011, but became ill from a related pneumonia and died on 9 May 2012 not far from his home in Hyde Park, Chicago.

== Early life and education ==
Bertram "Bert" Joseph Cohler was born in Chicago on 3 December 1938 to Theresa Belle "Betty" Cohler (née Cahn) and Jonas Robert Cohler. His siblings were Jonas Robert Cohler Jr., and Betsy Cohler. From the age of 10 to 17 years old, he was a student at the Orthogenic School, a residential treatment center for children with emotional disturbances run by Bruno Bettelheim; Bert Cohler lived in the Pirates Dormitory with seven other boys. Dean Robert Hess Koff PhD of Washington University in St. Louis was in the Pirates dorm when Bert arrived. Sandy Lewis, aka Salim Bonnor Lewis, founding managing partner of S B Lewis & Company in Wall Street, now of Lewis Family Farm, Essex, New York, was in the Pirates dorm for one month as Cohler matriculated. Koff and Lewis and numerous other Orthogenic students worked for Bettelheim at The Orthogenic School after graduating. Koff and Lewis were asked by Bettelheim to run The School. Years apart, Lewis and Cohler attended U-High, The Laboratory School of The University of Chicago, while living at The Orthogenic School. Lewis was present and visited with Cohler at The Orthogenic School in the last week of Cohler's tenure as director. Lewis was a donor in support of Bettelheim and in support of the director that followed Cohler, Jacqueline Seevak Sanders PhD. Sanders was a counselor at The School in 1952 when Cohler, Koff and Lewis were enrolled. Barbara A. Lisco was co-counselor with Jacqui Seevak in 1956–1957. In 1960 Lisco married Lewis. In 1963–1964. Lewis became Seevak's co-counselor. Cohler became The School's director as Bettelheim retired the first time, and was celebrated as one of its most successful graduates.

Cohler received his A.B. in Human Development from the University of Chicago in 1961. He then studied at Harvard University in the Department of Social Relations, an interdisciplinary collaboration among the departments of psychology, sociology, and anthropology. As a graduate student he assisted with coding and analysis of data from the Six Cultures Study under John and Beatrice Whiting. In 1964-5 he served as a teaching fellow with Gordon Allport for the course, Theories of Personality, and in 1967-9 was a lecturer in clinical psychology and shared responsibility for instruction of psychiatric residents in social psychiatry with Elliot G. Mishler. Among his major influences at Harvard, Cohler counted personality psychologists Gordon Allport and Henry A. Murray, and narrative psychologist Elliott Mishler. He received his Ph.D. in psychology from Harvard in 1967. His dissertation was titled "Character, Psychopathology, and Child Rearing Attitudes in Hospitalized and Non-Hospitalized Mothers of Young Children" (committee members: Justin L. Weiss, chair; Arthur S. Couch, Beatrice B. Whiting). Cohler returned to Chicago in 1969, where he trained in child and adult psychoanalysis at the Chicago Institute for Psychoanalysis.

In 1975, he received the Quantrell Award.

== Educator, clinician, administrator ==
In 1969, Cohler became an assistant professor at the University of Chicago and began working at the Sonia Shankman Orthogenic School. While Bruno Bettelheim was on leave in the early 1970s, Cohler served as director for several months.

In 1974, Cohler was promoted to Associate Professor at the University of Chicago, and in 1981 he was made full Professor. He was named William Rainey Harper Professor in Comparative Human Development and the college, with affiliations in the Department of Comparative Human Development, the Department of Psychology, and the Department of Psychiatry. He remained at the University of Chicago for the rest of his career.

During the course of his prolific teaching career Cohler taught in the departments of Human Development, Psychology, Psychiatry and Education, in the Graham School, and in the undergraduate College. Cohler was a strong advocate of undergraduate education at the university. For most of his career he taught in and served as chairman of the year-long Social Sciences core sequence of courses, Self, Culture and Society, in the college. He famously stated "I like all my students to call me by my first name, because we're in seminar together and I want to emphasize that we're all equal before the texts." Cohler won multiple teaching awards, including the Quantrell Award for Excellence in Undergraduate Teaching in 1972 and 1999 and the Norman Maclean Faculty Award for enriching student life in 2006.

Cohler was a practicing clinical psychologist and certified in psychoanalysis by the Chicago Institute for Psychoanalysis. He provided pro bono psychotherapy in private practice and through the Center on Halsted. His clinical work with patients of all ages informed his scholarly work on the life course, psychoanalysis, and identity work of LGBT individuals.

Cohler served on the first steering committee of Division 39 (the Division of Psychoanalysis) of the American Psychological Association. The APA awarded him the Henry A. Murray Award in personality psychology in 2007 and the Theodore Sarbin Award in recognition of distinguished contributions to theoretical and philosophical psychology in 2011. Cohler was on the faculty of the Chicago Institute for Psychoanalysis from 1991 until his death and taught in the Core Psychoanalytic Education Program, the Child and Adolescent Psychotherapy Program and in the Teacher Education Program. He also lectured at Institute for Clinical Social Work in Chicago from 1997 until his death.

== Scholarly work ==
In his research, Cohler attended to the evolution of identity and experience of self over the life span, with insights from psychoanalysis, particularly Heinz Kohut, and the psychological study of development including the work of Lev Vygotsky. Cohler made significant contributions across social science disciplines, bringing together ideas from life-course perspectives on human development (influenced especially by the work of Bernice Neugarten and Glen Elder) with psychoanalytic theory and narrative psychology and the personological study of lives. Cohler is credited as one of the early advocates of a narrative approach to the study of lives, with his widely cited article "Personal narrative and the life course."

In his later work, he turned his attention to ways in which people "make meanings of misfortune". He worked extensively on narrative analysis, informed by psychoanalytic insights, of the memoirs of men and women who were internees in the extermination camps of the Third Reich, and written at some point in the post-war period. He looked at the manner in which history and social change influenced how these life writers portrayed their experiences before, during, and following the terrible experiences in Auschwitz and other death camps.

== Books ==
- Cohler, B. J., H. U. Grunebaum, & D. M. Robbins. (1981) Mothers, Grandmothers, and Daughters: personality and child care in three-generation families. New York: Wiley. ISBN 0471059005; ISBN 978-0471059004.
- Galatzer-Levy, R. M. & B. J. Cohler (1994). The Essential Other: a developmental psychology of the self. Cambridge, MA: Harvard University Press. ISBN 0465020666; ISBN 978-0465020669.
- Cohler, B. J. & R. M. Galatzer-Levy (2000). The Course of Gay and Lesbian Lives: social and psychoanalytic perspectives. Chicago: University of Chicago Press. ISBN 0226113035; ISBN 978-0226113036.
- Cohler, B. J. (2007). Writing Desire: sixty years of gay autobiography. Madison, WI: University of Wisconsin Press. ISBN 0299222004; ISBN 978-0299222000.

== Edited books ==
- Anthony, J. E. & B. J. Cohler (1987) The Invulnerable child. New York: Guilford Press.
- Field, K., B. J. Cohler, & G. Wool. (1989) Learning and education: psychoanalytic perspectives. Madison, CT: International Universities Press.
- Hammack, P.L., & B. J. Cohler. (2009) The story of sexual identity: Narrative perspectives on the gay and lesbian life course. New York: Oxford University Press.

== Selected articles and chapters ==
- Cohler, B. J. (1977). "Some problems in the study of aging and death." Human Development, 20(4): 210–216.
- Cohler, B. J. (1982). "Personal narrative and the life course." In: P. Baltes & O. G. Brim (Eds.), Life span development and behavior (Vol. 4, pp. 205–241). New York: Academic Press.
- Boxer, A. M. & B. J. Cohler (1989). "The life course of gay and lesbian youth: an immodest proposal for the study of lives." Journal of Homosexuality, 17(3-4): 315–355.
- Cohler, B. J. & M. J. Jenuwine (1995). "Suicide, life course, and life story." Int Psychogeriatr 7(2): 199–219.
- Cohler, B. J. (1996). "Psychic reality and the analyst: the inner working of the analyst's mind." International Journal of Psychoanalysis, 77 (Pt 1): 89–95.
- Cohler, B. J., & Hammack, P. L. (2006). "Making a gay identity: Life-story and the construction of a coherent self." In. D.P. McAdams, R. Josselson & A. Lieblich (Eds). Identity and story: Crafting self in narrative. Washington DC: The American Psychological Association, 151–17.
- Cohler B. J., & Galatzer-Levy, R. (2006). Love in the classroom: Desire and transference in teaching and learning. In: Boldt, G.M., & Salvo, P.M. (Eds.) Love's return: Psychoanalytic essays on teaching and learning. New York: Routledge, 243–26.
- Cohler, B. J., & Smith, G. (2006). "Cultural dilemmas of masculinity." In: Bedford, V.H. & B.F. Turner (Eds.) Men in relationships: A new look from a life-course perspective. New York: Springer Publishing Company, 3–2.
- Cohler, B. J., & Hammack, P. L. (2007). "The psychological world of the gay teenager: Social change and the issue of 'Normality,'" The Journal of Youth and Adolescence, 36, 47–5.
- Cohler, B. J., & Hostetler, A. (2007). "Gay lives in the third age." In: P. Wink & J. James (Eds.) The crown of life: Dynamics of the early post-retirement period. New York: Springer Publishing Company, 263–28.
- Cohler, B. J., & Galatzer-Levy, R.(2007) "What kind of a science is psychoanalysis?" Psychoanalytic Inquiry (Special Issue: Psychoanalysis and science (Ed. M. Bornstein), 27, 547–58.
- Cohler, B. J.(2008). "Nostalgia and the disappointment with modernity: Memory books as adaptive response to Shoah." In: W. Parsons, D. Jonte-Pace, & S. Henking (Eds.) Mourning religion. Charlottesville, VA: University of Virginia Press, 201–22.
- Cohler, B. J. (2008). "Two lives, two times: Life-writing after Shoah," Narrative Inquiry, 18, 1–2.

== See also ==
- History of psychology
- Clinical ethnography
- Harvard Department of Social Relations
