= Evon Z. Vogt =

American anthropologist

- Born: August 18, 1918; Gallup, New Mexico, United States
- Died: May 13, 2004 (aged 85); Cambridge, Massachusetts, United States
- Education: University of Chicago
- Scientific career
- Fields: Cultural anthropology
- Workplaces: Harvard University
- Doctoral advisor: Fred Eggan, Clyde Kluckhohn
- Doctoral students: Carol J. Greenhouse, Joyce Marcus, Victoria Bricker, Frank Cancian, John B. Haviland

Evon Zartman Vogt, Jr. (August 18, 1918 – May 13, 2004) was an American cultural anthropologist best known for his work among the Tzotzil Mayas of Chiapas, Mexico.

Vogt was the author of numerous articles and 19 books. He was a fellow of the American Academy of Arts and Sciences (1960), a member of the National Academy of Sciences (1979), a member of the American Philosophical Society (1999), and a recipient of the Order of the Aztec Eagle, the highest honor awarded to foreigners by the Mexican government.

== Biography ==
Vogt Jr., born in Gallup, New Mexico, to Evon Z. Vogt Sr. and Shirley Bergman. Vogt attended the University of Chicago on a full scholarship, and earned his B.A. in geography in 1941. After spending the years of World War II in the Navy, Vogt returned to the University of Chicago to pursue graduate studies. He received his M.A. in 1946 and his Ph.D. in 1948.

Vogt initially joined the faculty at Harvard University as an instructor in the Department of Social Relations. He was later promoted to professor, and would spend the entirety of his career at Harvard, serving in time as Chairman of the Department of Anthropology, Co-Master of Kirkland House (with his wife Catherine C. Vogt), and Chairman of the Center for Latin American Studies. He directed the Harvard Chiapas Project, which focused on the indigenous Tzotzil Maya of the central highlands of Chiapas, Mexico.

Vogt died on May 13, 2004, in Cambridge, Massachusetts.

== Published works ==
Vogt's publications include:

- 1951 Navaho Means People. Harvard University Press, with Clyde Kluckhohn, photos by Leonard McCombe.
- 1955 Modern Homesteaders. The Life of a Twentieth-Century Frontier Community. Belknap Press (of Harvard University Press).
- 1959 Water Witching USA. University of Chicago Press, with Ray Hyman.
- 1966 People of Rimrock; a study of values in five cultures. Harvard University Press, edited by Evon Z. Vogt and Ethel M. Albert
- 1969 Zinacantan: A Maya Community in the Highlands of Chiapas. Cambridge: The Belknap Press (of Harvard University Press).
- 1976 Tortillas for the Gods: A Symbolic Analysis of Zinacanteco Rituals. Cambridge: Harvard University Press.
- 1979 Reader in Comparative Religion: An Anthropological Approach. Allyn & Bacon; 4 edition (January 20, 1997) with William A. Lessa.
- 1994 Fieldwork Among the Maya: Reflections on the Harvard Chiapas Project. Albuquerque: University of New Mexico Press.

== See also ==
- Evon Zartman Vogt Ranch House
