= Elliott Mishler =

American social psychologist

Elliot George Mishler (October 6, 1924 – March 21, 2018) was an American social psychologist who had significant influence on the development of narrative psychology.

== Life and work ==
Mishler was born in Astoria, New York in 1924. He completed his doctoral degree at the University of Michigan in 1951. His dissertation was entitled: Personality Characteristics And The Resolution Of Role Conflicts.

He was Professor of Social Psychology in the Department of Social Psychiatry at Harvard Medical School. Here he was involved in teaching research methods to psychiatry residents. At the same time he began to publish a series of important works on aspects of qualitative research. His classic work on Research Interviewing was published in 1991.

His home was the location for regular discussion of narrative and other concepts in psychology as well as forms of social activism.

He had substantial influence on the work of many scholars including Bertram Cohler, Brinton Lykes.

Throughout his life he was involved in various forms of social activism. He took his sons to their first demonstrations against the war in Vietnam in 1965, and he continued to fight against racism, militarism, and injustice throughout his life, including holding family reunions at marches against the War in Iraq.

== Selected publications ==
=== Books ===
- Mishler, E.G. (1999). Storylines: Craft Artists' Narratives of Identity. Cambridge, MA: Harvard University Press.
- Mishler, E.G. (1991). Research Interviewing: Context and narrative. Cambridge, MA: Harvard University Press.
- Mishler, E.G. (1984). The Discourse of Medicine: Dialectics of medical interviews. Norwood, NJ: Ablex Publishing Corp.
- Mishler, E.G. et al. (1981). Social Contexts of Health, Illness, and Patient Care. Cambridge, MA: Harvard University Press.
- Mishler, E.G. & Waxler, N.E. (1969). Interaction in Families: An Experimental Study of Family Processes and Schizophrenia. New York: Wiley.

=== Book chapters ===
- Mishler, E.G. (1996). Foreword. In Ignacio Martin-Baro Writings for a Liberation Psychology edited by A. Aron & S. Corne. Cambridge, MA: Harvard University Press.
- Mishler, E. G. (1986). The analysis of interview-narratives. In T. R. Sarbin (Ed.), Narrative psychology (pp. 233–255). New York: Praeger.

=== Journal articles ===
- Harvey, M. R., Mishler, E. G., Koenen, K., & Harney, P. A. (2000). In the aftermath of sexual abuse: Making and remaking meaning in narratives of trauma and recovery. Narrative Inquiry, 10(2), 291–311.
- Mishler, E. G. (1990). Validation in inquiry-guided research: The role of exemplars in narrative studies. Harvard Educational Review. 60(4) November: 415–442.
- Mishler, E. G. (1995). Models of narrative analysis: A typology. Journal of Narrative & Life History, 5(2), 87-123.
- Mischer, E. G., Clark, J. A., Ingelfinger, J., & Simon, M. P. (1989). The language of attentive patient care: A comparison of two medical interviews. Journal of General Internal Medicine, 4, 325–335.
- Mishler, E. G. (1979). Meaning in context: Is there any other kind? Harvard Educational Review, 49(1), 1-19.
