= Vogt House =

Vogt House may refer to:

- Vogt House (Iowa City, Iowa), listed on the National Register of Historic Places in Johnson County, Iowa
- Evon Zartman Vogt Ranch House, listed on the NRHP in New Mexico
- Vogt House (Brownville, New York), listed on the NRHP in Jefferson County, New York
