= Marc Swartz =

Anthropologist specializing in eastern Africa

Marc Jerome Swartz (31 October 1931 – 14 December 2011) was an American political and cultural anthropologist specializing in eastern Africa.

Born in Omaha, Nebraska, Swartz trained in anthropology in the interdisciplinary Department of Social Relations at Harvard, receiving his PhD in 1958.

He was a founding member of the Department of Anthropology at the University of California, San Diego, where he served as a member of the faculty for 36 years. During his career, Swartz was a founding member of the Society for Cultural Anthropology, former chairman of the American Society for Political Anthropology, a life member of the American Anthropological Association, a fellow of the Royal Anthropological Institute and a member of the National Geographic Research board of editors.

Swartz conducted extensive field research among indigenous peoples in highland Tanzania (the Bena), in Kenya (coastal Swahili, and on Chuuk atoll (formerly known as Truk) in the southwestern Pacific Ocean. In each case he was accompanied and assisted by his wife of 58 years, Audrey. Swartz has devoted his professional life to examining how culture affects various facets of human interaction, such as the emergence and maintenance of social status, aggression, sexuality, and medical beliefs.He thought that shared, passed-down, normative, and morally binding common understandings were what characterized human cultures. He disputed the casual use of the word ‘culture’ to refer to artifacts or behaviors. To him, culture was what's in your head,” said David K. Jordan, UC San Diego professor emeritus of anthropology and a longtime friend and colleague to Swartz.

In addition to many scholarly papers, he wrote and edited a number of books, including “The Way the World Is,” “Local Level Politics,” “Political Anthropology” (with Victor Turner and Arthur Tuden) and, with David K. Jordan, “Culture, the anthropological perspective,” “Personality and the Cultural Construction of Society” and a textbook, “Anthropology: Perspective on Humanity.”
