= Man: A Course of Study =

American humanities teaching program

Man: A Course of Study, usually known by the acronym MACOS or M.A.C.O.S., was an American humanities teaching program, initially designed for middle school and upper elementary grades. It was popular in the United States and United Kingdom in the 1970s.

== Basis ==
It was based on the theories of Jerome Bruner, particularly his concept of the "spiral curriculum". This suggested that a concept might be taught repeatedly within a curriculum, but at a number of levels, each level being more complex than the first. The process of repetition would thus enable the child to absorb more complex ideas easily.

== History and contents ==
In MACOS, the concept was "the chain of life" or a "lifeline": the entire history of a living thing. The course started with a simple lifespan in the form of the Pacific Coast salmon. It then moved on to the more complex life form of the herring gull, introducing concepts such as nurturing. The lifespan of the baboon was next examined, particularly within the societal context afforded by the baboon troop. The differences between innate behaviour and learned behaviour were introduced. Finally, the study opened up into a study of a man's lifespan with a case study of Netsilik Inuit. This also included the interaction between the Netsilik and other life forms, such as reindeer and seals.

The course comprised a self-contained kit of course materials, film cassettes, visual aids, and games. Some of the activities were very imaginative; a game based upon reindeer migration had a loaded die to introduce discussion about instincts, and a paper seal would be cut up and shared among class members representing various people in the Netsilik community, according to a ritual governing who was entitled to which part of the animal.

The emphasis of the course was upon learning particular skills within the teaching process, not upon the significance of the content. This included the necessity to ask questions, discuss, and reach conclusions based on evidence and argument.

== Criticism ==
The course was much criticized in the United States because of its emphasis upon questioning aspects of the American tradition, including Western paradigms of belief and morality. Critics also challenged its basis in empirical science; Robert Flaherty's Nanook of the North was initially misrepresented as a scientific report on Inuit society, but later recognized as a revolutionary film and considered the intellectual ancestor of the documentary form. The course booklet itself contained criticisms of its validity, particularly from fundamentalist groups.

== Media ==
In 2004, the National Film Board of Canada produced Through These Eyes, a documentary about the controversy surrounding MACOS, and more generally about the interplay between politics and education.

== Collections ==
The Institute of Education, University College London holds a collection of material relating to MACOS. The collection comprises pamphlets, posters, films, and images. It was donated by a British teacher who used the project in his school in 2013.
