= Clyde Kluckhohn =

American anthropologist and social theorist

- Born: January 11, 1905; Le Mars, Iowa, U.S.
- Died: July 28, 1960 (aged 55); Santa Fe, New Mexico, U.S.
- Education: Princeton University; University of Wisconsin, Madison (BA); Corpus Christi College, Oxford; University of Vienna; Harvard University (MA, PhD)
- Awards: Viking Fund Medal (1950)
- Scientific career
- Fields: Cultural anthropology
- Workplaces: Harvard University
- Doctoral students: Elizabeth Colson, Laura Nader, Walter Taylor, Evon Z. Vogt

Clyde Kay Maben Kluckhohn (/ˈklʌkhoʊn/; January 11, 1905 in Le Mars, Iowa – July 28, 1960 near Santa Fe, New Mexico), was an American anthropologist and social theorist, best known for his long-term ethnographic work among the Navajo and his contributions to the development of theory of culture within American anthropology. During his lifetime, Kluckhohn was a member of the American Academy of Arts and Sciences (1944), the United States National Academy of Sciences (1952), and the American Philosophical Society (1952).

== Early life and education ==
Kluckhohn matriculated at Princeton University, but was forced by ill health to take a break from study and went to convalesce on a ranch in New Mexico owned by his mother's cousin's husband, Evon Z. Vogt (father of anthropologist Evon Z. Vogt Jr.). During this period he first came into contact with neighboring Navajo and began a lifelong love of their language and culture. He wrote two popular books based on his experiences in Navajo country, To the Foot of the Rainbow (1927) and Beyond the Rainbow (1933).

He resumed study at the University of Wisconsin–Madison and received his AB in Greek 1928. He then studied classics at Corpus Christi College, Oxford as a Rhodes Scholar in 1928–1930 For the following two years, he studied anthropology at the University of Vienna and was exposed to psychoanalysis. After teaching at the University of New Mexico from 1932 to 1934, he continued graduate work in anthropology at Harvard University where he received his Ph.D. in 1936. He remained at Harvard as a professor in Social Anthropology and later also Social Relations for the rest of his life.

== Major works ==
In 1949, as part of a large, interdisciplinary research project called the "Comparative Study of Values in Five Cultures," Kluckhohn began to work among five adjacent communities in the American Southwest: Zuni, Navajo, Mormon (LDS), Spanish-American (Mexican-American), and Texas Homesteaders. A key methodological approach that he developed together with his wife Florence Rockwood Kluckhohn and colleagues Evon Z. Vogt and Ethel M. Albert, among others, was the Values Orientation Theory. They believed that cross-cultural understanding and communication could be facilitated by analyzing a given culture's orientation to five key aspects of human life: Human Nature (people seen as intrinsically good, evil, or mixed); Man-Nature Relationship (the view that humans should be subordinate to nature, dominant over nature, or live in harmony with nature); Time (primary value placed on past/tradition, present/enjoyment, or future/posterity/delayed gratification); Activity (being, becoming/inner development, or doing/striving/industriousness); and Social Relations (hierarchical, collateral/collective-egalitarian, or individualistic). The Values Orientation Method was developed furthest by Florence Kluckhohn and her colleagues and students in later years.

Kluckhohn received many honors throughout his career. In 1947 he served as president of the American Anthropological Association and became first director of the Russian Research Center at Harvard. In the same year his book Mirror for Man won the McGraw Hill award for best popular writing on science.

Kluckhohn initially believed in the biological equality of races but later reversed his position. Kluckhohn wrote in 1959 that "in the light of accumulating information as to significantly varying incidence of mapped genes among different peoples, it seems unwise to assume flatly that 'man's innate capacity does not vary from one population to another'.... On the premise that specific capacities are influenced by the properties of each gene pool, it seems very likely indeed that populations differ quantitatively in their potentialities for particular kinds of achievement."

Clyde Kluckhohn died of a heart attack in a cabin on the Upper Pecos River near Santa Fe, New Mexico. He was survived by his wife, Dr. Florence Rockwood Kluckhohn, who also taught anthropology at Harvard's Department of Social Relations. Clyde Kluckhohn was also survived by his son, Richard Kluckhohn. Most of his papers are held at Harvard University, but some early manuscripts are kept at the University of Iowa.

== Interlocutors ==
- Edward Low
- Elizabeth Colson
- Florence Rockwood Kluckhohn
- Alfred L. Kroeber
- Dorothea Leighton
- Talcott Parsons
- Evon Z. Vogt

== Selected publications ==
- (1927) To the Foot of the Rainbow, a 1920s equestrian exploration through the Old Southwest.
- (1933) Beyond the Rainbow, a book about traveling in Hopi and Navaho land.
- (1943) Review of Sun chief; The autobiography of a Hopi indian., edited by Leo W. Simmons. American Anthropologist 45:267-270.
- (1949) Mirror for Man, New York: Fawcett.
- Kluckhohn, Clyde, Leonard McCombe, and Evon Z. Vogt (1951) Navajo means People. Cambridge, MA: Harvard University Press.
- (1951). "Values and value-orientations in the theory of action: An exploration in definition and classification." In T. Parsons & E. Shils (Eds.), Toward a general theory of action. Cambridge, MA: Harvard University Press.
- Kroeber, Alfred and Kluckhohn, Clyde (1952) Culture: A Critical Review of Concepts and Definitions.
- Murray, Henry A. and Clyde Kluckhohn, (1953) Personality in Nature, Society, and Culture.
- (1961) Anthropology and the Classics, Brown University Press.
- (1962) Culture and Behavior: Collected Essays, Free Press of Glencoe.
