= Ruthellen Josselson =

American academic

Ruthellen Josselson is an American academic in the field of clinical psychology. Her research focuses on women's identity and human relationships.

Josselson earned her Doctor of Philosophy in clinical psychology from the University of Michigan in 1972. In 2004, she earned a diploma in Group Psychology from the American Board of Professional Psychology.

Josselson was previously a professor at the Hebrew University of Jerusalem and Towson University, as well as a visiting professor at Harvard University, and a visiting fellow at Cambridge University. She is co-director of the Irvin D. Yalom Institute of Psychotherapy, editor of Qualitative Psychology, and co-editor of The Narrative Study of Lives. She is presently a professor of clinical psychology at Fielding Graduate University and a psychotherapist in practice.

Josselson founded the Society of Qualitative Inquiry.

== Awards and honors ==
Josselson has been a fellow with the American Psychological Association (1999), A. K. Rice Institute (2000), and the Hebrew University of Jerusalem (2001-02). She has received various awards and honors, including the following:

- Woodrow Wilson Fellowship (1967-68)
- Danforth Fellowship in College Teaching (1968)
- Towson University Merit Award (1985)
- Fulbright Fellowship (1989-1990)
- Henry A. Murray Award, American Psychological Association (1994)
- Distinguished Contributions to Qualitative Research Award, American Psychological Association
- Delta Kappa Gamma International Educator's Award (1997)
- Theodore R. Sarbin Award

== Books ==
- Josselson, Ruthellen (1996). The space between us: exploring the dimensions of human relationships. Thousand Oaks London New Delhi: Sage Publications. ISBN 978-0-7619-0126-6.
- Josselson, Ruthellen (2007). Irvin D. Yalom: On Psychotherapy and the Human Condition. Jorge Pinto Books. ISBN 978-0979557613.
- Josselson, Ruthellen (2012). Transforming Self, Transforming Institutions: The Life and Leadership Lessons of Faith Gablenick. AK Rice Institute. ISBN 978-0578107288.
- Josselson, Ruthellen (2013). Interviewing for qualitative inquiry: a relational approach. New York: Guilford Press. ISBN 978-1-4625-1000-9.
- Josselson, Ruthellen (2017). Paths to fulfillment: women's search for meaning and identity. New York, NY: Oxford University Press. ISBN 978-0-19-025039-3.
- Josselson, Ruthellen (2007). Playing Pygmalion: how people create one another. Lanham, Md: Jason Aronson. ISBN 978-0-7657-0487-0. OCLC 82673580.
- Josselson, Ruthellen; Hammack, Phillip L. (2021). Essentials of narrative analysis. Essentials of qualitative methods series. Washington, DC: American Psychological Association. ISBN 978-1-4338-3738-8.
- Josselson, Ruthellen (2022). Narrative and cultural humility: reflections of a "good witch" teaching psychotherapy in China. Explorations in narrative psychology. New York, NY: Oxford University Press. ISBN 978-0-19-766735-4.
