= Sakkiassee Anaija =

Inuk artist

- Born: 1913
- Died: 1980 (aged 66–67)

Sakkiassee Anaija (1913–1980) was an Inuk artist. Anaija was known for his carvings in whalebone, antler, stone and ivory. Anaija was born in the Netsilik territory of the Northwest Territories.

His work is included in the collections of the National Gallery of Canada, the Carleton University Art Gallery and the Winnipeg Art Gallery.
