= William A. Lessa =

American anthropologist (1908–1997)

William Armand Lessa (3 March 1908 – 14 October 1997) was an American academic and anthropologist.

He studied chemistry at Harvard University and earned his PhD in anthropology from the University of Chicago in 1947; his dissertation detailed his experiences in Europe during World War II. He was hired by the University of California, Los Angeles. Termed "one of the pillars of anthropology in Micronesia", Lessa is best known for his work on Ulithi Atoll.
