= Nathan Kogan =

American psychologist (1926–2013)

Nathan Kogan (May 2, 1926 – April 28, 2013) was an American psychologist. His research was in the fields of cognitive, personality, social, developmental, and evolutionary psychology. He published more than 100 articles and chapters as well as five books as an author or co-author. He served as professor emeritus of psychology at the New School for Social Research and was a visiting scholar at Educational Testing Service.

== Life and work ==
Kogan's Jewish parents immigrated to the United States from Poland and Ukraine. He was born in Bethlehem, Pennsylvania, on May 2, 1926. He attended Lehigh University, graduating in 1948, and attended graduate school at Harvard University. He initially studied animal learning while at Harvard, but switched to cognition. He graduated in 1954 with a PhD.

Until his death, Kogan remained active in psychology. He died on April 28, 2013, at age 86 in Princeton, New Jersey.

== Awards ==
Kogan received the Sir Francis Galton Award from the International Association for Empirical Aesthetics; the Farnsworth Award from the Society for the Psychology of Aesthetics, Creativity, and the Arts; and the SAGES Award from the Society for the Psychological Study of Social Issues. He served as president of the Society for the Psychology of Aesthetics, Creativity, and the Arts twice and was a fellow of the American Psychological Association, the American Association for the Advancement of Science, and the Gerontological Society of America.
