= Ethel M. Albert =

American ethnologist (1918–1989)

Ethel Mary Albert
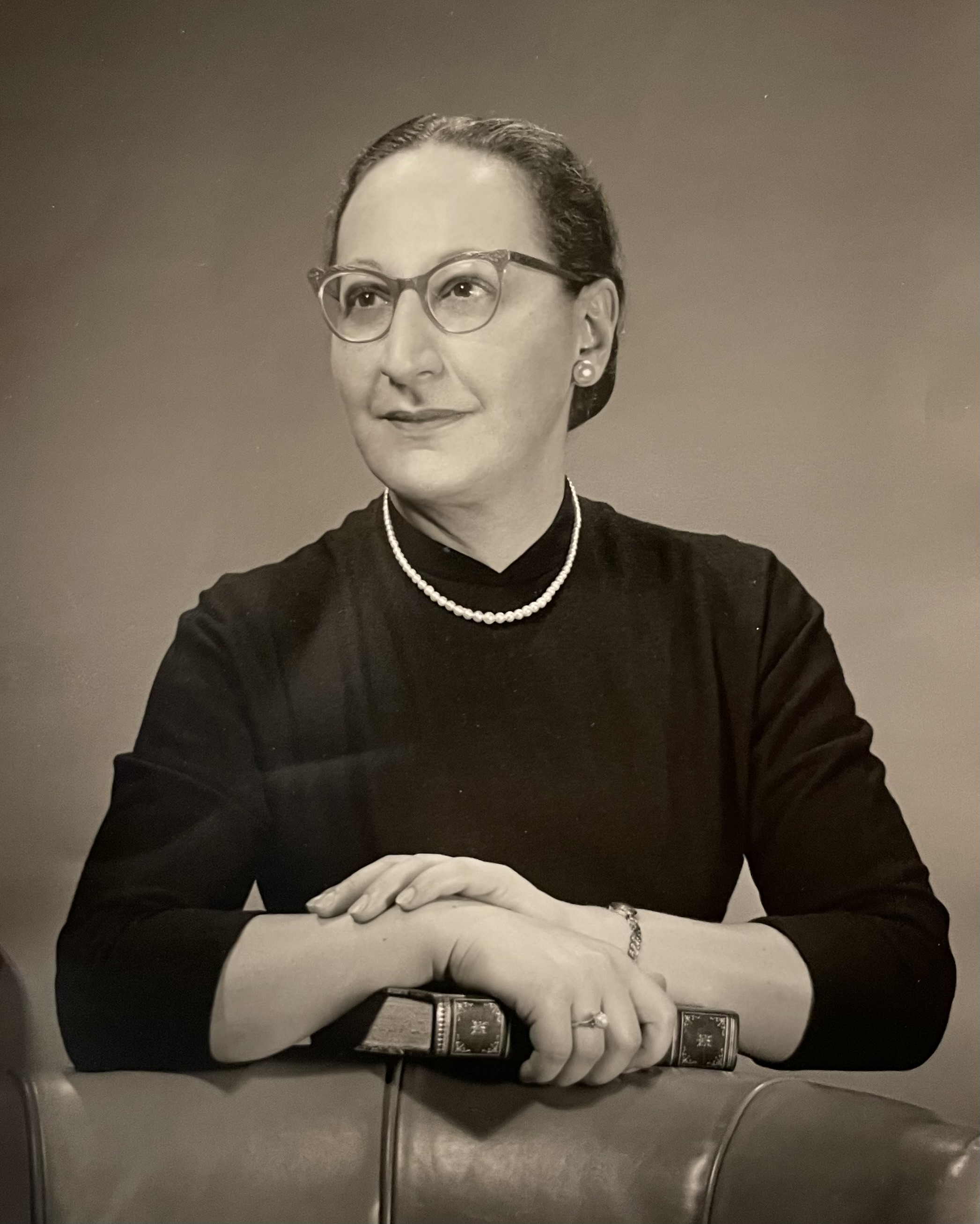
- Ethel M. Albert, c. 1962
- Born: March 28, 1918; New Britain, Connecticut
- Died: October 1989 (aged 71); Sarasota, Florida
- Education: Brooklyn College; Columbia University; University of Wisconsin
- Known for: Ethnological research among the Navajo (Diné) and Rundi

Ethel M. Albert (28 March 1918 – October 1989) was an American ethnologist. Albert conducted ethnological research related to speech, values, and ethics, employing a cross-cultural approach studying different social classes, ethnic groups, and locations. Albert conducted research with the Navajo (Diné) in the American southwest and the Rundi people in the Republic of Burundi. Albert is most well known among late twentieth-century American semiotics researchers for reviving semiotics in the American university curriculum.

== Early life and education ==
Ethel Mary Albert was born in New Britain, Connecticut, on March 28, 1918, to Zundel and Dorothy (Eisenstadt) Sokolsky. She received a Bachelor of Arts from Brooklyn College in 1942 and a Master of Arts from Columbia University in 1947. Albert received a PhD in philosophy from the University of Wisconsin in 1949. Albert taught philosophy at Brooklyn College from 1946 to 1947 while pursuing graduate studies at Columbia University. After receiving her PhD in 1949, Albert taught philosophy at Syracuse University from 1949 to 1952.

== Career ==
Hungarian semiotician Thomas Albert Seboek described Albert as "by profession a cultural anthropologist, by avocation a self-taught semiotician, by employment then a research associate on Kluckhohn's staff." American anthropologist Clyde Kluckhohn was a researcher of the Navajo (Diné) people at Harvard University and the author of Navaho Witchcraft (1944). Albert worked as a research associate at the Laboratory of Social Relations at Harvard University shortly before Kluckhohn's death in 1960. Albert's affiliation with Harvard was confirmed in her 1956 article, "The classification of values: a method and illustration," published in the American Anthropologist. Albert had moved to the University of California by 1964.

Albert developed a variety of research interests, including cross-cultural anthropological studies of values and speech, semiotics, and eventually later in her life, fatalism.

== Fieldwork with the Navajo (Diné) ==
Albert's research focused on comparative ethnophilosophy and value systems in different Native American groups. In 1953, she became a research associate at the Laboratory of Social Relations at Harvard University, a position she held until 1955 while conducting fieldwork with the Navajo (Diné). Albert created a descriptive-analysis method for classifying values as specific parts of a value system, contributing her own data related to the Navajo Nation to a cross-cultural analysis of value systems among five communities in the American southwest (Navajo, Zuni, Spanish American, Texan, and Mormon). Albert utilized this value scheme to describe the value system of the Ramah Band of the Navajo Nation. Albert's research utilized field notes, protocols, life histories, and monographs for analysis and generalization of value categories. Many of these materials are now at the National Anthropological Archives.

Albert acknowledged the many confounding factors that challenge ethnophilosophical research. Albert noted that no individual can provide the content of an entire Navajo community's value system, as there are individual differences in viewpoint and changes in beliefs and values that occur over time. She also studied cultural changes relative to the American value system. Albert prevented her research from being overwhelmed by these variables by forming a "normal operating base" of the value system. This normal operative base provided a reference point for the discussion of differences in individual beliefs and behaviors. Albert actively identified what she called "focal values," which vary between different nations. Albert identified knowledge, familial life, material possessions, and health as focal values for Ramah Navajo. Albert studied Navajo ontology through Navajo myths, origin stories, songs, and rituals that she recorded during her fieldwork and discussed in her publications.

== Fieldwork among the Rundi people ==
From 1955 to 1957, Albert was awarded a Ford Foundation Fellowship in the Overseas Africa Program to conduct an ethnographic study of the Tutsi, Hutu, and Twa people of Burundi. The Rundi are a people of the Republic of Burundi who speak Rundi, a Bantu language. Hundreds of speakers of the Rundi language live in Uganda, Tanzania, and Rwanda. Albert studied speech differences based on class, age, and sex groups among the Rundi people, studying Burundi speaking rules in different social circumstances [3]. Albert was especially interested in speech differences among women in the patrilineal Rundi society. In particular, Albert studied how the speech of Burundi women varied based on their social caste.

Albert studied speech training among boys and girls in the Burundi tribe, including how they compose amazina, or "praise poems," funeral orations, or rhetoric as opposed to girls who are taught to listen and repeat conversations. Albert showed that women of higher social castes were able to exert authority despite and somewhat because of their silence. Albert also studied Burundi speech rules related to petitioning a superior, formal or informal visiting, social ceremonies, rules of precedence and good speech manners, respect patterns and role relativism and orders of speaking based on social rank. Albert used texts and biographies from the Burundi for her research related to values like her work with the Navajo (Diné). Albert also studied different political behaviors among closely related countries, including between Ruanda and Urundi.

Albert published her work widely and contributed to the publications of other researchers. Albert published her research related to social values based on social statutes among the Burundi in Denise Paulme's Women of Tropical Africa. She also edited the People of Rimrock: A Study of Values in Five Cultures (1967), along with Evon Z. Vogt. Albert also applied her value system research in the United States, publishing an article on value uncertainty and value conflicts in American society, related to changes in the mid-twentieth century and the presence of alternative value systems make up of different cultural groups in American society.

Despite her contributions to publications, semiotician Thomas Albert Seboek noted that it was her teaching rather than her publications that ensured her legacy in late-twentieth century American semiotics. Albert taught graduate seminars on semiotics focused on discourse analysis and systematic lexicography, reviving semiotics in the American university curriculum 25 years after Charles Morris' seminars at the University of Chicago. Albert was also active in teaching anthropology and creating educational resources for students. She contributed to the Teaching of Anthropology (1963), by David G. Mandelbaum, and served as assistant director of the Ethnology of Educational Resources in Anthropology Project.

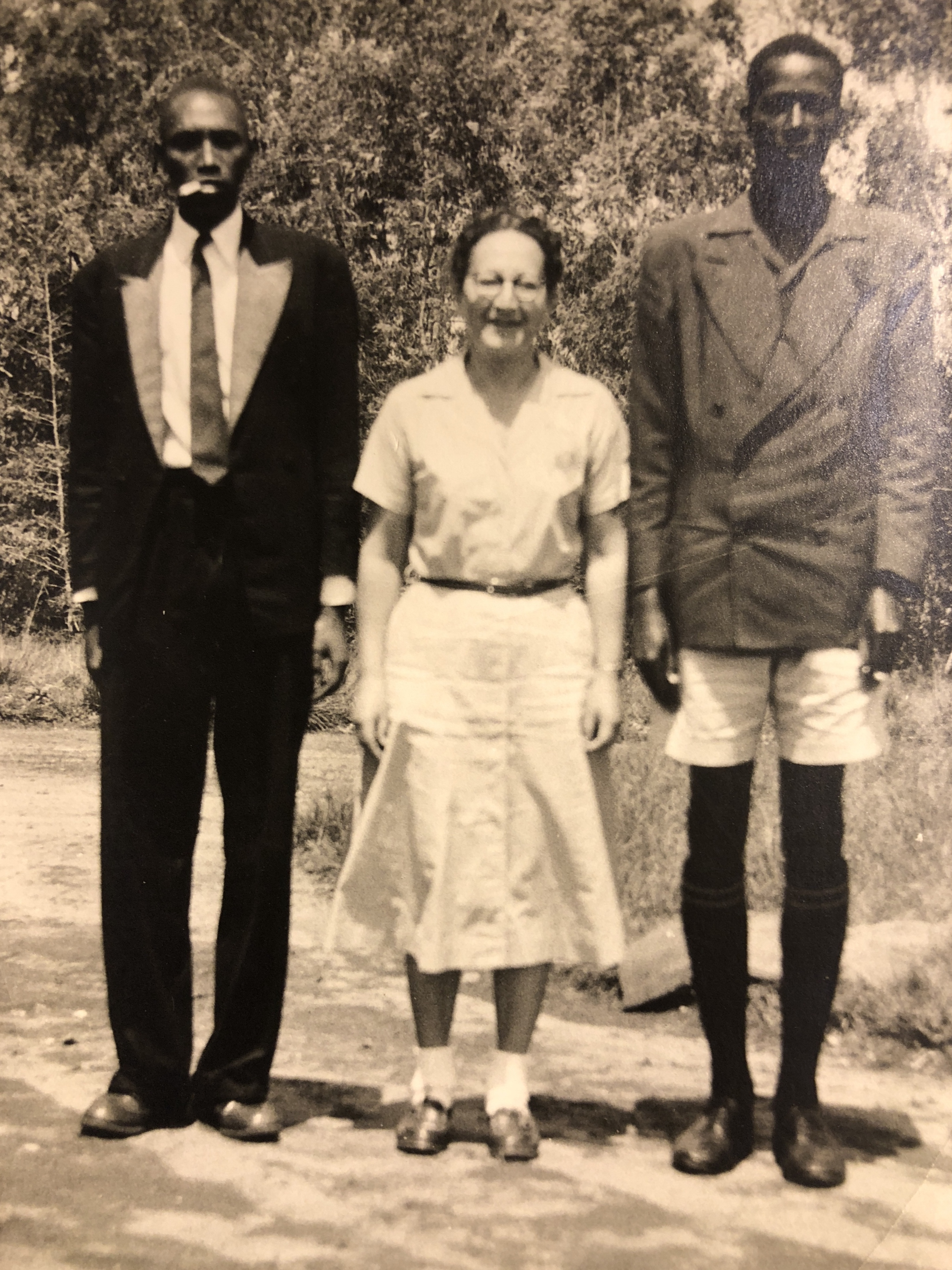
Two Batutsi and Ethel Albert, 1956

== Academic positions ==
Albert maintained numerous academic positions throughout her career. From 1957 to 1958, Albert became a Fellow at the Center for Advanced Study in the Behavioral Sciences in Stanford, California. From 1958 to 1966, Albert taught speech at the University of California at Berkley. According to a record from the United States Bureau of Educational and Cultural Affairs in 1961, Albert studied the beliefs, laws, and values of the non-literate peoples in the Ruandi-Urundi territory during this tenure. Albert taught anthropology and speech at Northwestern University from 1966 to 1977. Albert served as chairman of the Committee for African Studies, later renamed the Institute of International Studies, at the University of California at Berkeley from 1963 to 1965 before being appointed vice-chairman of the Speech Department at the University of California at Berkeley in 1964. Albert worked as a professor of anthropology and speech at Northwestern University from 1966 to 1977, becoming chairman of the Anthropology and Speech Department in 1973.

Albert was actively involved in professional anthropological associations. She participated in a two-day conference of regional specialists in West and Central Africa fieldwork in May 1958 at Northwestern University. The product of this conference was the Field Guide to West and Central Africa (1959), by Alvin William Wolfe. Albert became the assistant director of Ethnology for the National Science Foundation Project on Educational Resources in Anthropology for 1960 and 1961.

== Later life ==
Albert actively encouraged the continuation of her work in semiotics and ethnographic semantics. In 1966, Albert commented on a paper about ethnographic semantics, stating that she hoped that more work would be done related to this topic in the field. Later in life, Albert began a manuscript on cross cultural studies of fatalism, but it remains unpublished. Notes and drafts of Albert's unpublished manuscript are in the Ethel Mary Albert Papers at the National Anthropological Archives.

Semiotician Thomas Albert Seboek notes that he kept in touch with Albert throughout the 1960s after he first met her in Kluckhohn's Harvard office. He explains in his book Global Semiotics that Albert was forced into early retirement due to a progressive chronic disease. Albert died in October 1989 in Sarasota, Florida at the age of 71.

The Ethel Mary Albert Papers are kept at the National Anthropological Archives. Albert's papers include writings, photographs, and sound recordings from her research among the Burundi, Rundi texts and biographies, research materials from Albert's fieldwork with the Navajo (Diné), and materials related to cross cultural studies of fatalism.

== Selected bibliography ==
- 1956 "The classification of values: a method and illustration." American Anthropologist 58, no. 2: 221–248.
- 1960 "Socio-political organization and receptivity to change: Some differences between Ruanda and Urundi." Southwestern Journal of Anthropology 16, no. 1: 46–74.
- 1963 "Women of Burundi: A study of social values." In Women of tropical Africa, edited by Denise Paulme, pp. 179–217.
- 1963 "Conflict and Change in American Values a Culture-Historical Approach." Ethics 74, no. 1 (1963): 19–33.
- 1964 "'Rhetoric,' 'Logic,' and 'Poetics' in Burundi: Culture Patterning of Speech Behavior." American Anthropologist 66, no. 6: 35–54.
- 1969 Great Traditions in Ethics. New York: American Book Co.
- 1970 "Conceptual Systems in Africa." In The African Experience, Volume I: Essays, edited by John N. Paden and Edward W. Soja, pp. 99–100.
