= Evon Zartman Vogt Ranch House =

Historic house in New Mexico, United States

- U.S. National Register of Historic Places
- NM State Register of Cultural Properties
- Location within New Mexico Location within the United States
- Nearest city: Ramah, New Mexico
- Coordinates: 35°7′15″N 108°29′0″W
- Area: less than one acre
- Architect: Evon Zartman Vogt
- Architectural style: Bungalow/Craftsman, Vernacular Bungalow
- NRHP reference No.: 92001819
- NMSRCP No.: 1509

Significant dates
- Added to NRHP: February 4, 1993
- Designated NMSRCP: August 4, 1989

The Evon Zartman Vogt Ranch House is a historic house in the U.S. state of New Mexico. It was constructed in 1915, in the foothills of the Zuni Mountains one mile (1.6 km) southeast of Ramah, New Mexico. It is located about 500 feet (150 m) east of State Highway 53. It was listed on the National Register of Historic Places in 1993.

== History ==
Evon Zartman Vogt, born in Upper Sandusky, Ohio in 1880. He entered the University of Chicago in 1902, where he became a member of Delta Upsilon fraternity. In his junior year, he was diagnosed with tuberculosis, which necessitated a change of climate. Hence, he moved to the Territory of New Mexico and worked as the postmaster in Glorieta and later on a ranch on the slopes of Mount Taylor, near the railroad town of Grants. After a long vacation in Europe in 1914 he returned to Chicago and married Shirley Bergman, and brought her to their new residence in Ramah, New Mexico. They built their house of sandstone and adobe, raised four children, and as the largest sheep ranchers in New Mexico experienced both fortune and as well as economic privation through the 1920s and 1930s.

Evon, known by all as "Skeeter", and by the Navajo as Pesoteaje ("Little Fat Pig"), was the first Custodian of El Morro National Monument, also known as Inscription Rock, 10 miles (16 km) southeast of their ranch. He also founded the first newspaper in that part of New Mexico, the Gallup Gazette (which became the Gallup Independent), was the Master of Ceremonies for many years of the Gallup Ceremonial, and served as Agent for the Ramah Navajo Reservation. Evon died in 1943; his widow, Shirley, maintained the ranch as a guest/dude ranch during the 1950s and lived there until her death in 1986.

The Vogt Ranch House is still owned and occupied by Evon Vogt's direct descendants. His eldest daughter, Barbara Vogt Mallery, wrote an acclaimed book about her parents' lives entitled "Baling Wire and Gamuza" in 2003. The book was awarded one of the "Southwest Books of the Year 2004" by the Arizona Star newspaper. Barbara's elder brother, Evon Zartman Vogt, Jr. (1918–2004), a noted anthropologist and former Co-Master of Kirkland House at Harvard University, acquired his interest in cultural anthropology thanks to the many local cultures with which the family interacted on a daily basis.

== See also ==
- National Register of Historic Places listings in McKinley County, New Mexico
