= Robert A. Levine =

American anthropologist (1932–2023)

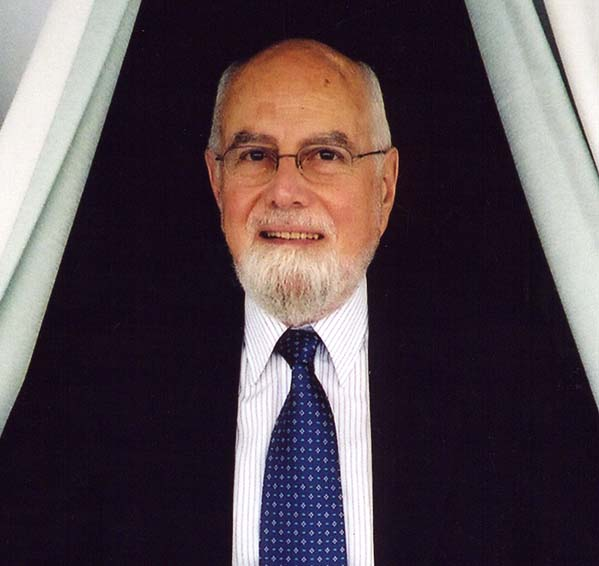
- Born: March 27, 1932; New York City, New York, U.S.
- Died: August 2023 (aged 91)
- Education: University of Chicago (BA, MA); Harvard University (PhD)
- Scientific career
- Fields: Anthropology; Psychological anthropology; Social anthropology
- Workplaces: Northwestern University; University of Chicago; Harvard University
- Thesis: "Social control and socialization among the Gusii.." (1958)

Robert Alan Levine (March 27, 1932 – August 2023) was an American anthropologist best known for his multidisciplinary and cross-cultural work on child development. He spent much of his academic career at the Harvard Graduate School of Education, where he had been an emeritus professor since 1998.

== Life and career ==
Robert Levine grew up in New York. He completed his undergraduate studies at the University of Chicago in 1951 and then an M.A. in anthropology there in 1953. He then studied in the Department of Social Relations at Harvard, from which he received his PhD in Social Anthropology in 1958, based on fieldwork among the Gusii in East Africa. He taught at University of Chicago from 1960 to 1976. During that time, he also pursued research training in psychoanalysis at the Chicago Institute for Psychoanalysis. In 1976, he returned to Harvard where he was faculty in the Graduate School of Education until his formal retirement in 1998, though he continued to be active in research and mentoring for many years after his official retirement.

Levine's influence on psychological anthropology and the comparative study of childhood has been wide-ranging. Among other concepts, he is known for advancing a pluralistic view of ethnopsychologies, including critiquing contemporary psychological trait theory as ethnocentric.

Levine was recognized in many ways for his contributions to social and psychological anthropology and to the understanding of child development. He was named to the U.S. National Academy of Education in 1979 and the American Academy of Arts and Sciences in 1989. In 1980, he was elected president of the Society for Psychological Anthropology, and in 1997 he received the SPA's Lifetime Achievement Award. In 1992–1993, LeVine was a Fellow at the Swedish Collegium for Advanced Study in Uppsala, Sweden.

Levine died in August 2023, at the age of 91. His wife, Sarah, died within the same month.

== Selected publications ==
- LeVine, R.A. (1971). The psychoanalytic study of lives in natural social settings. Human Development, 14, 100–109.
- LeVine, R.A. (1973, 2nd Edition 1982). Culture, Behavior, and Personality: An Introduction to the Comparative Study of Psychosocial Adaptation. Chicago: Aldine. (Second Edition: New York: Aldine de Gruyter, 1982). (First Edition Spanish translation, 1977).
- LeVine, R.A., ed. (1974). Culture and Personality: Contemporary Readings. Chicago: Aldine.
- Shweder, R. & LeVine, R.A., eds. (1984). Culture Theory: Essays on Mind, Self and Emotion. Cambridge, U.K.: Cambridge University Press.
- LeVine, R.A. (1984). Properties of culture: An ethnographic view. In R. Shweder & R.A. LeVine (eds.), Culture Theory: Essays on Mind, Emotion, and the Self. New York: Cambridge University Press.
- LeVine, R.A., Miller, P. & West, M.M., eds. (1988). Parental Behavior in Diverse Societies. New Directions for Child Development Sourcebook No. 40. San Francisco: Jossey-Bass.
- LeVine, R.A. (1990). Enculturation: A biosocial perspective on the development of self. In D. Cicchetti (ed.), The Development of the Self. Chicago: University of Chicago Press.
- LeVine, R.A. (1990). Infant environments in psychoanalysis: A cross-cultural view. In R. Shweder, G. Herdt & J. Stigler (eds.), Cultural Psychology: and Human Development. New York: Cambridge University Press.
- LeVine, R.A., Dixon, S., LeVine, S., Richman, A., Keefer, C., Leiderman, P.H. & Brazelton, T.B. (1994). Child Care and Culture: Lessons from Africa. New York: Cambridge University Press.
- Shweder, R.A., Goodnow, J., Hatano, G., LeVine, R.A., Markus, H., and Miller, P. (1998). The cultural psychology of development: One mind, many mentalities. In R.M. Lerner (ed.), Vol. 1, Theoretical Models of Human Development, The Handbook of Child Psychology, 5th edition (edited by W. Damon). New York: Wiley
- LeVine, R.A. (2002). Contexts and culture in psychological research. In J. Bempechat and J.G. Elliott (eds.), Learning in Culture and Context: Approaching the Complexities of Achievement Motivation in Student Learning. New Directions for Child and Adolescent Development, no. 96. Jossey-Bass Education Series. New York: John Wiley & Sons.
- LeVine, R.A. (2003). Childhood Socialization: Comparative Studies of Parenting, Learning and Educational Change. CERC Monograph No. 20. Hong Kong: Comparative Education Research Centre, University of Hong Kong.
- LeVine, R.A. and New, R.S., eds. (2008). Anthropology and Child Development: A Cross-Cultural Reader. Malden, MA: Blackwell Publishers. New York: Wiley-Blackwell.
- LeVine, R.A. (2007) Ethnographic studies of childhood: A historical overview. American Anthropologist 109: 247–260.
- LeVine, R.A., ed., (2010). Psychological Anthropology: A Reader on Self in Culture. Malden, MA: Wiley-Blackwell.
- Levine, R. A., and Levine, S. (2017) Do Parents Matter? Why Japanese Babies Sleep Soundly, Mexican Siblings Dont Fight, and American Families Should Just Relax. New York, NY: PublicAffairs.
