= John B. Haviland =

American linguist

John Beard Haviland is an anthropological linguist, or linguistic anthropologist, from the United States. Some of his major research has been with speakers of Tzotzil (Mayan) Chiapas, Mexico, and with Paman languages of Cape York Peninsula in the Commonwealth of Australia. He is a professor at the University of California, San Diego, and previously was one at Reed College. He has an AB and PhD from Harvard University.

== Bibliography ==
- “Guugu Yimidhirr” in R. M. W. Dixon and Barry J. Blake (editors), Handbook of Australian Languages. Canberra 1979. Pages 27–180.
- Sk’op Sotz’leb; El Tzotzil de San Lorenzo Zinacantán. Ciudad de México 1981.
