= Jerome Bruner =

American psychologist and scholar (1915–2016)

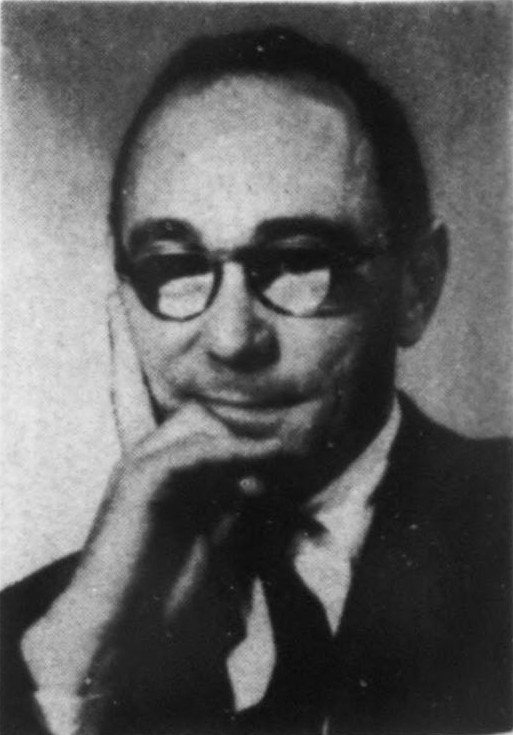
- Born: Jerome Seymour Bruner; October 1, 1915; New York City, New York, U.S.
- Died: June 5, 2016 (aged 100); Manhattan, New York City, New York, U.S.
- Education: Duke University; Harvard University
- Known for: Contributions to cognitive psychology and educational psychology Coining the term "scaffolding"
- Awards: E. L. Thorndike Award (1981); Balzan Prize (1987); CIBA Gold Medal for Distinguished Research Distinguished Scientific Award of the American Psychological Association
- Scientific career
- Fields: Psychology
- Workplaces: Harvard University; New York University; University of Oxford
- Thesis: A psychological analysis of international radio broadcasts of belligerent nations (1941)
- Doctoral advisor: Gordon Allport
- Doctoral students: Susan Carey; Howard Gardner; Edward E. Jones; Alan M. Leslie; Dan Slobin; Roy Pea; Andrew N. Meltzoff; Alison Gopnik
- Website: www.psych.nyu.edu/bruner/

Jerome Seymour Bruner (October 1, 1915 – June 5, 2016) was an American psychologist who made significant contributions to human cognitive psychology and cognitive learning theory in educational psychology. Bruner was a senior research fellow at the New York University School of Law. He received a BA in 1937 from Duke University and a PhD from Harvard University in 1941. He taught and conducted research at Harvard University, the University of Oxford, and New York University. A Review of General Psychology survey, published in 2002, ranked Bruner as the 28th most cited psychologist of the 20th century.

== Education and early life ==
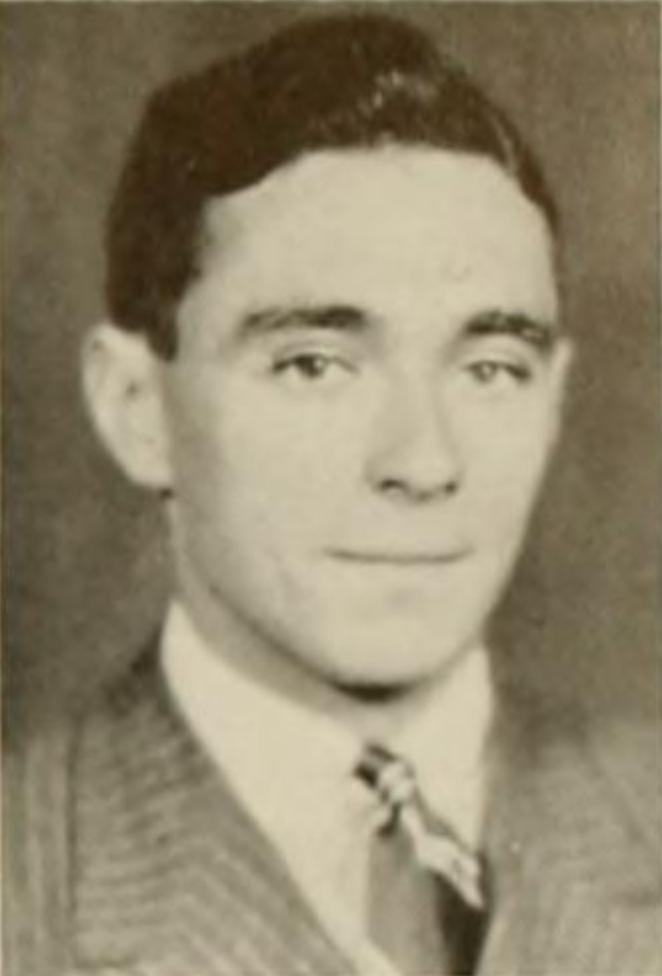
Bruner pictured in the ''Chanticleer'' 1936, as a junior at Duke University

Bruner was born blind (as a result of cataracts) on October 1, 1915, in New York City, to Polish Jewish immigrants, Herman and Rose Bruner. An operation at age 2 restored his vision. He was awarded a Bachelor of Arts degree in psychology from Duke University in 1937; a master's in psychology in 1939 and a doctorate in psychology in 1941, both from Harvard University. Bruner published his first article on a psychological subject in 1939, examining the effect of thymus extract on the sexual behavior of the female rat. During World War II, Bruner served on the Psychological Warfare Division of the Supreme Headquarters Allied Expeditionary Force committee under General Dwight D. Eisenhower, researching social psychological phenomena.

== Career and research ==
Bruner returned to Harvard in 1945 in the role of psychology professor, focusing on research in the fields of cognitive and educational psychology. In 1972, he left Harvard to teach at the University of Oxford in the United Kingdom. He returned to the United States in 1980, to continue his research in developmental psychology. In 1991, Bruner joined the faculty at New York University (NYU), where he taught primarily in the School of Law.

As an adjunct professor at NYU School of Law, Bruner studied the effects of psychological factors on legal practice. During his career, Bruner was awarded honorary doctorates from Yale University, Columbia University, The New School, the Sorbonne, the ISPA Instituto Universitário, as well as from colleges and universities in Berlin and Rome; he was a Fellow of the American Academy of Arts and Sciences, and a member of the American Philosophical Society. Bruner was a distinguished member of Psi Chi. He turned 100 in October 2015 and died on June 5, 2016.

=== Cognitive psychology ===
Bruner is one of the pioneers of cognitive psychology in the United States, which began through his own early research on sensation and perception as being active, rather than passive processes.

In 1947, Bruner published his study Value and Need as Organizing Factors in Perception, in which children from advantaged and disadvantaged backgrounds were asked to estimate the size of coins or wooden disks the size of American pennies, nickels, dimes, quarters and half-dollars. The results showed that the value and need the poor and rich children associated with coins caused them to significantly overestimate the size of the coins, especially when compared to their more accurate estimations of the same size disks.

Similarly, another study conducted by Bruner and Leo Postman showed slower reaction times and less accurate answers when a deck of playing cards reversed the color of the suit symbol for some cards (e.g. red spades and black hearts). These series of experiments issued in what some called the 'New Look' psychology, which challenged psychologists to study not just an organism's response to a stimulus, but also its internal interpretation. After these experiments on perception, Bruner turned his attention to the actual cognitions that he had indirectly studied in his perception studies.

In 1956, Bruner published the book A Study of Thinking, which formally initiated the study of cognitive psychology. Soon afterward Bruner helped found the Harvard Center of Cognitive Studies. After a time, Bruner began to research other topics in psychology, but in 1990 he returned to the subject and gave a series of lectures, later compiled into the book Acts of Meaning. In these lectures, Bruner contested the computer model of the mind, advocating a more holistic understanding of cognitive processes.

=== Developmental psychology ===
Beginning around 1967, Bruner turned his attention to the subject of developmental psychology and studied the way children learn. He coined the term "scaffolding" to describe an instructional process in which the instructor provides carefully programmed guidance, reducing the amount of assistance as the student progresses through task learning. Bruner suggested that students may experience, or "represent" tasks in three ways: enactive representation (action-based), iconic representation (image-based), and symbolic representation (language-based). Rather than neatly delineated stages, the modes of representation are integrated and only loosely sequential as they "translate" into each other. Symbolic representation remains the ultimate mode, and it "is clearly the most mysterious of the three."

Bruner's learning theory suggests that it is efficacious, when faced with new material, to follow a progression from enactive to iconic to symbolic representation; this holds true even for adult learners. A true instructional designer, Bruner's work also suggests that a learner (even of a very young age) is capable of learning any material so long as the instruction is organized appropriately, in sharp contrast to the beliefs of Piaget and other stage theorists. Like Bloom's Taxonomy, Bruner suggests a system of coding in which people form a hierarchical arrangement of related categories. Each successively higher level of categories becomes more specific, echoing Benjamin Bloom's understanding of knowledge acquisition as well as the related idea of instructional scaffolding.

In accordance with this understanding of learning, Bruner proposed the spiral curriculum, a teaching approach in which each subject or skill area is revisited at intervals, at a more sophisticated level each time. First there is basic knowledge of a subject, then more sophistication is added, reinforcing principles that were first discussed. This system is used in China and India. Bruner's spiral curriculum, however, draws heavily from evolution to explain how to learn better and thus it drew criticism from conservatives. In the United States classes are split by grade—life sciences in 9th grade, chemistry in 10th, physics in 11th. The spiral teaches life sciences, chemistry, physics all in one year, then two subjects, then one, then all three again to understand how they mold together. Bruner also believed learning should be spurred by interest in the material rather than tests or punishment, since one learns best when one finds the acquired knowledge appealing.

=== Educational psychology ===
While Bruner was at Harvard he published a series of works about his assessment of current educational systems and ways that education could be improved. In 1961, he published the book Process of Education. Bruner also served as a member of the Educational Panel of the President's Science Advisory Committee during the presidencies Lyndon Johnson. Referencing his overall view that education should not focus merely on memorizing facts, Bruner wrote in Process of Education that "knowing how something is put together is worth a thousand facts about it." From 1964 to 1996 Bruner sought to develop a complete curriculum for the educational system that would meet the needs of students in three main areas which he called Man: A Course of Study. Bruner wanted to create an educational environment that would focus on (1) what was uniquely human about human beings, (2) how humans got that way and (3) how humans could become more so. In 1966, Bruner published another book relevant to education, Towards a Theory of Instruction, and then in 1973, another book, The Relevance of Education. Finally, in 1996, in The Culture of Education, Bruner reassessed the state of educational practices three decades after he had begun his educational research. Bruner was also credited with helping found the Head Start early childcare program. Bruner was deeply impressed by his 1995 visit to the preschools of Reggio Emilia and has established a collaborative relationship with them to improve educational systems internationally. Equally important was the relationship with the Italian Ministry of Education which officially recognized the value of this innovative experience.

=== Language development ===
In 1972, Bruner was appointed Watts Professor of Experimental Psychology at the University of Oxford, where he remained until 1980. In his Oxford years, Bruner focused on early language development. Rejecting the nativist account of language acquisition proposed by Noam Chomsky, Bruner offered an alternative in the form of an interactionist or social interactionist theory of language development. In this approach, the social and interpersonal nature of language was emphasized, appealing to the work of philosophers such as Ludwig Wittgenstein, John L. Austin and John Searle for theoretical grounding. Following Lev Vygotsky the Russian theoretician of socio-cultural development, Bruner proposed that social interaction plays a fundamental role in the development of cognition in general and of language in particular. He emphasized that children learn language in order to communicate, and, at the same time, they also learn the linguistic code. Meaningful language is acquired in the context of meaningful parent-infant interaction, learning "scaffolded" or supported by the child's language acquisition support system (LASS).

At Oxford Bruner worked with a large group of graduate students and post-doctoral fellows to understand how young children manage to crack the linguistic code, among them Alison Garton, Alison Gopnik, Magda Kalmar (Kalmár Magda), Alan Leslie, Andrew Meltzoff, Anat Ninio, Roy Pea, Susan Sugarman, Michael Scaife, Marian Sigman, Kathy Sylva and many others. Much emphasis was placed on employing the then-revolutionary method of videotaped home-observations, Bruner showing the way to a new wave of researchers to get out of the laboratory and take on the complexities of naturally occurring events in a child's life. This work was published in a large number of journal articles, and in 1983 Bruner published a summary in the book Child's talk: Learning to Use Language.

This decade of research established Bruner at the helm of the interactionist approach to language development, exploring such themes as the acquisition of communicative intents and the development of their linguistic expression, the interactive context of language use in early childhood, and the role of parental input and scaffolding behavior in the acquisition of linguistic forms. This work rests on the assumptions of a social constructivist theory of meaning according to which meaningful participation in the social life of a group as well as meaningful use of language involve an interpersonal, intersubjective, collaborative process of creating shared meaning. The elucidation of this process became the focus of Bruner's next period of work.

=== Narrative construction of reality ===
In 1980, Bruner returned to the United States, taking up the position of professor at the New School for Social Research in New York City in 1981. For the next decade, he worked on the development of a theory of the narrative construction of reality, culminating in several seminal publications which contributed to the development of narrative psychology. His book Acts of Meaning has been cited over 20,000 times followed by Actual Minds, Possible Worlds which has been cited by over 18,000 scholarly publications, making them two of the most influential works of the 20th century. In these books, Bruner argued that there are two forms of thinking: the paradigmatic and the narrative. The former is the method of science and is based upon classification and categorization. The alternative narrative approach organizes everyday interpretations of the world in storied form. The challenge of contemporary psychology is to understand this everyday form of thinking.

=== Legal psychology ===
In 1991, Bruner arrived at NYU as a visiting professor to do research and to found the Colloquium on the Theory of Legal Practice.

== Collections ==
Bruner's personal archive is held at Harvard University Archives. It includes correspondence, research material, and extensive writings. After Bruner's death his family donated his library of 3200 books to the Max Planck Institute for Psycholinguistics in the Netherlands. In 2020 a library at the Institute was named after him to house the books and support further research into Bruner's field.

The Institute of Education, University College London holds a collection of material relating to Man: A Course of Study, an education course based on Bruner's work. The collection comprises pamphlets, posters, films, and images. It was donated by a British teacher who used the project in his school in 2013.

== Publications ==
=== Books ===
- A Study of Thinking. 1956.
- Bruner, Jerome S. (2009) [1960]. The Process of Education. Cambridge: Harvard University Press. ISBN 978-0-674-71001-6.
- Studies in Cognitive Growth. 1966.
- Bruner, Jerome Seymour; Bruner, University Professor Jerome (1966). Toward a Theory of Instruction. ISBN 978-0-674-89701-4.
- Processes of Cognitive Growth: Infancy. 1968.
- Beyond the Information Given: Studies in the Psychology of Knowing. W. W. Norton & Company. 1973. ISBN 978-0-393-09363-6.
- Bruner, Jerome Seymour (1979). On Knowing: Essays for the Left Hand. ISBN 978-0-674-63525-8.
- Child's Talk: Learning to Use Language. 1983.
- In Search of Mind: Essays in Autobiography. 1983.
- Bruner, Jerome S. (1985). Actual Minds, Possible Worlds. ISBN 978-0-674-00366-8.
- Lurii͡a, Aleksandr Romanovich; Bruner, Jerome S. (1987). "Foreword". The Mind of a Mnemonist: A Little Book about a Vast Memory. ISBN 978-0-674-57622-3.
- Bruner, Jerome S. (1990). Acts of Meaning. ISBN 978-0-674-00361-3.
- Bruner, Jerome Seymour (1996). The Culture of Education. ISBN 978-0-674-17953-0.
- Amsterdam, Anthony G.; Bruner, Jerome S. (2000). Minding the Law. ISBN 978-0-674-00816-8.
- Bruner, Jerome Seymour (2003). Making Stories: Law, Literature, Life. ISBN 978-0-674-01099-4.

=== Selected articles ===
- Bruner, J. S. & Goodman, C. C. (1947). "Value and need as organizing factors in perception". Journal of Abnormal and Social Psychology, 42, 33–44.
- Bruner, J. S. & Postman, L. (1947). "Tension and tension-release as organizing factors in perception". Journal of Personality, 15, 300–308.
- Bruner, J. S. & Postman, L. (1949). "On the perception of incongruity: A paradigm. Journal of Personality, 18, 206–223.
- Bruner, J. S. (1975). "The ontogenesis of speech acts". Journal of Child Language, 2, 1–19. (The most cited article in the Journal of Child Language)
- Scaife, M., Bruner, J. S. (1975). "Capacity for joint visual attention in the infant". Nature, 253, 265–266.
- Bruner, J. S. (1975/76). "From communication to language: A psychological perspective". Cognition, 3, 255–287.
- Bruner, J. S. (1976). "Prelinguistic prerequisites of speech". In R. Campbell and P. Smith (Eds.), Recent Advances in the Psychology of Language, 4a, 199–214. New York: Plenum Press.
- Bruner, J. S., and Sherwood, V. (1976). "Early rule structure: The case of peekaboo". In J. S. Bruner, A. Jolly, and K. Sylva (Eds.), Play: Its Role in Evolution and Development. London: Penguin Books.
- Wood, D., Bruner, J., & Ross, G. (1976). "The role of tutoring in problem solving". Journal of Child Psychology and Psychiatry and Allied Disciplines, 17, 89–100.
- Bruner, J. S. (1977). "Early social interaction and language acquisition". In H. R. Schaffer (Ed.), Studies in Mother-infant Interaction (pp. 271–289). London: Academic Press.
- Bruner, J. S., Caudill, E. and Ninio, A. (1977). "Language and experience". In R. S. Peters (Ed.), John Dewey Reconsidered. Routledge & Kegan Paul.
- Ninio, A. and Bruner, J. S. (1978). "The achievement and antecedents of labelling". Journal of Child Language, 5, 1–15. Reprinted in M. B. Franklin and S. S. Barten (eds.), "Child Language: A Reader" (pp. 36–49). New York: Oxford University Press (1988).
- Ratner, N. and Bruner, J. S. (1978). "Games, social exchange and the acquisition of language". Journal of Child Language, 5, 391–401.
- Bruner, J. S. (1978). "On prelinguistic prerequisites of speech". In R. N. Campbell and P. T. Smith, (eds.), Recent Advances in the Psychology of Language (Vol. 4a. pp. 194–214). New York: Plenum Press.
- Bruner, J. S. (1978). "Learning how to do things with words". In J. S. Bruner and R. A. Garton, (eds), Human Growth and Development (pp. 62–84). Oxford: Clarendon Press.
- Bruner, J. S. (1978). "The role of dialogue in language acquisition". In A. Sinclair, R. J. Jarvella, and W. J. M. Levelt (Eds.), The Child's Conception of Language (pp. 241–256). New York: Springer-Verlag.
- Bruner, J. S., Roy, C., and Ratner, N. (1982). "The beginnings of request". In K. E. Nelson, (Ed.), Children's Language (Vol. 3. pp. 91–138). Hillsdale, NJ: Lawrence Erlbaum.
- Bruner, J. S. (1983). "The acquisition of pragmatic commitments". In R. Golinkoff, (Ed.), The Transition from Prelinguistic to Linguistic Communication (pp. 27 42). Hillsdale, NJ: Lawrence Erlbaum Associates.
- Bruner, J. S. (1985). "Models of the Learner". Educational Researcher, June/July, 5–8.
- Bruner, J. (1995). "From joint attention to the meeting of minds". In C. Moore & P. Dunham (eds.), Joint Attention: Its Origins And Role In Development. Hillsdale, N.J.: Erlbaum.
- "The Narrative Construction of Reality" (1991). Critical Inquiry, 18:1, 1–21.
- "The Autobiographical Process" (1995). Current Sociology. 43.2, 161–177.
- Shore, Bradd (March 1997). "Keeping the Conversation Going: An Interview with Jerome Bruner". Ethos. 25 (1): 7–62. doi:10.1525/eth.1997.25.1.7. JSTOR 640457.
- Mattingly, C; Lutkehaus, N. C.; Throop, C. J. (2008). "Bruner's Search for Meaning: A Conversation between Psychology and Anthropology". Ethos. 36 (1): 1–28. doi:10.1111/j.1548-1352.2008.00001.x. PMC 2919784. PMID 20706551.

== See also ==
- Bradd Shore
- Constructionism
- Constructivism
- Cognitivism
- Cognitivism (learning theory)
- Cognitive linguistics
- Cognitive psychology
- Cognitive revolution
- Narrative psychology
- Narrative therapy
