= Narrative psychology =

Psychological theories concerning stories

Narrative psychology is a perspective in psychology concerned with the "storied nature of human conduct", that is, how human beings deal with experience by observing stories and listening to the stories of others. Operating under the assumption that human activity and experience are filled with "meaning" and stories, rather than lawful formulations, narrative psychology is the study of how human beings construct stories to deal with experiences.

== Definition ==
The word narrative is used as a specific method. It is a method of articulating life experiences in a meaningful way. Narrative psychology is not a single or well-defined theory. It refers to a range of approaches to stories in human life and thought. In narrative psychology, a person's life story becomes a form of identity that informs how they choose to reflect on, integrate, and tell the facts and events of their life, reflecting and shaping who they are. It is a social constructivist approach that studies the implications of these stories for individuals and societies.

== History ==
Psychologists became interested in stories and everyday accounts of life in the 1970s. The term narrative psychology was introduced by Theodore R. Sarbin in his 1986 book Narrative Psychology: The storied nature of human conduct in which he claimed that human conduct is best explained through stories and that this explanation should be done through qualitative research. Sarbin argued that "narrative" is a root metaphor for psychology that should replace the mechanistic and organic metaphors which shaped so much theory and research in the discipline over the past century.

Jerome Bruner explored the "narrative kind of knowing" in a more empirical way in his 1986 book Actual Minds, Possible Worlds. Bruner makes a distinction between "paradigmatic" and "narrative" forms of thought, proposing that they are both fundamental but irreducible to one another. The hermeneutic philosopher Paul Ricoeur argued that since we live in a changing world, creating narratives helps to bring order to the changing flux.

The narrative approach was also furthered by Dan P. McAdams, who put forward a life story model of identity to describe three levels of personality, leading to explorations of how significant life transitions are narrated and how the "self and culture come together in narrative".

Narrative psychological approaches have become influential in research into the self and identity, as analysing life stories can explore the "unity and coherence" of the self. More recently, narrative psychology has sought to use quantitative research to study communication and identity, studying narratives to obtain empirical data about human social cognition and adaptation.

== Practice ==
Narrative psychologists use interviews to provide an opportunity for a person to give a detailed account of their life or particular events. Elliot Mishler has criticized the standard use and analysis of interviews. Qualitative researchers often disrupt the storytelling nature of interviews and ignore the narrative structure of transcribed interviews.

Narrative researchers provide more opportunity for interviewees to provide a more extended narrative account of particular experiences. These narrative interviews can then be transcribed and analyzed to explore both their structure and content with reference to the immediate and broader social context.

== Examples ==
According to Brown and Taylor (1997), formerly enslaved African-Americans have made contributions to narrative psychology by participating in the Federal Writers' Project that was conducted from 1937 to 1938. Nearly three hundred field workers participated in the process of interviewing 2000 former slaves across seventeen states to construct narratives from the former slaves' accounts of their lives as slaves and during the period after the Civil War. One of the best interviewers was said to be folklorist Ruby Pickens Tartt, who worked principally in rural Sumter County in Alabama. She recorded exactly what the slaves would say in their interviews, and she went on to write folk tales based on their tales.

== Future ==
T.L. Brink and Victoria Karalun (2022) contend that the different historical and contemporary schools of psychology (e.g., Positive Psychology) are converging on narratives as the central element in 21st century psychology, mediating between such constructs as moods, attitudes, personality traits and roles.

== See also ==
- Constructivism
- Jerome Bruner
- Mark Turner
- Narrative therapy
- Script analysis
- Theodore R. Sarbin
