= John Whiting (anthropologist) =

American anthropologist (1908–1999)

John Wesley Mayhew Whiting (June 12, 1908 Chilmark, Massachusetts – May 13, 1999, Chilmark, Massachusetts) was an American sociologist and anthropologist, specializing in child development.

Whiting grew up on Martha's Vineyard, on the Massachusetts coast. He received his B.A. in 1931 and his Ph.D. in sociology & anthropology in 1938, both from Yale University. He remained at Yale until 1947 on the staff of Yale Institute of Human Relations. After two years at the State University of Iowa, he was offered a position at Harvard in the Graduate School of Education. In 1963 he transferred to the Department of Social Relations, where he taught and conducted research in anthropology and comparative child development.

Together with his wife Beatrice, John Whiting organized the Six Cultures Study of Socialization, the largest and most comprehensive comparative study of child rearing and child development. The study assigned teams of anthropologists with interdisciplinary training in psychology and child development to six sites around the world: The six cultures studied are "Nyansongo: a Gusii community in Kenya" (Robert A. LeVine and Barbara B. LeVine); "the Rajputs of Khalapur, India" (Leigh Minturn and John T. Hitchcock); "Taira: an Okinawan village" (Thomas W. Maretzki and Hatsumi Maretzki); "the Mixtecans of Juxtlahuaca, Mexico" (Kimball Romney and Romaine Romney); "Tarong: an Ilocos barrio in the Philippines" (William F. Nydegger and Corinne Nydegger); and "the New Englanders of Orchard Town, USA". (John L. Fischer and Ann Fischer). The Whitings continued work on comparative child development, both with their own fieldwork and through many students and collaborators, throughout their careers.

In 1973, the American Psychological Association honored him with the G. Stanley Hall Award for Distinguished Contributions to Developmental Psychology. Whiting was elected the first President of the Society for Psychological Anthropology in 1978. In 1982, John and his wife, Beatrice (née, Blyth) Whiting, won the American Anthropological Association's Distinguished Service Award. In 1989, they received the Society's first Career Contribution Award.
