= Beatrice Blyth Whiting =

American anthropologist

Beatrice Blyth Whiting (14 April 1914, in New York City – 29 September 2003, in Cambridge, Massachusetts), was an American anthropologist specializing in the comparative study of child development. Together with her husband John Whiting, she was a key figure in the Harvard Department of Social Relations and a pioneer in the cross-cultural study of childhood and child development.

Born on Staten Island in 1914, she received her B.A. from Bryn Mawr College in 1935. She then studied anthropology at Yale. In 1943, she became one of the first women to receive a PhD from that department for her fieldwork among the Paiute Indians of Oregon. Her dissertation advisor was anthropologist George Murdock.

Beatrice Whiting did much of her work in collaboration with her husband John Whiting, also an anthropologist at Harvard. Often they did fieldwork together, with Beatrice focusing on the experience of women and girls and John focusing on the experience of men and boys.

Beatrice Whiting joined the Harvard faculty in 1952. In 1954, she and her husband began the Six Cultures Study of Socialization, a project that involved field studies in Mexico, India, Kenya, Okinawa, the Philippines and the United States. The project continues to be regarded as one of the most ambitious comparative studies of child development and family life. In 1966, the Whitings founded the Child Development Research Unit at the University of Nairobi to conduct more intensive studies in Kenya. She became one of the first women to receive tenure at Harvard University when she was named professor at the graduate school of education in 1974. In the 1980s, after their retirement from Harvard, the Whitings turned their attention to older children, directing the Comparative Adolescence Project. She was elected a Fellow of the American Academy of Arts and Sciences in 1981.

== Personal life ==
When not in Cambridge or on fieldwork expeditions, the Whitings spent significant time in Chilmark, on Martha's Vineyard, where John had grown up. They had two children.
